= Ovarian cancer =

Cancer originating in or on the ovary

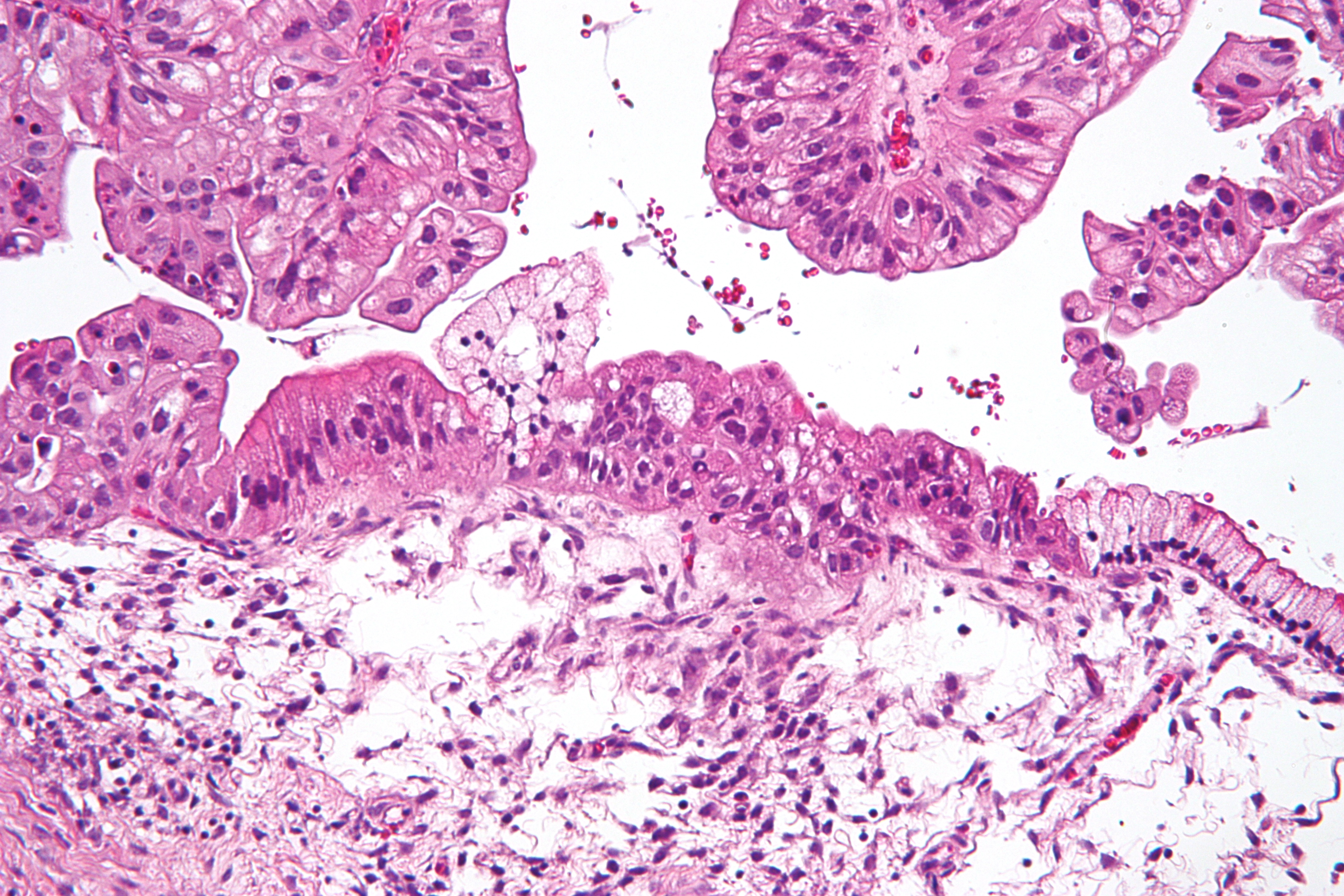
- Micrograph of a mucinous ovarian carcinoma stained by H&E
- Specialty: Gynecologic oncology
- Symptoms: Early: vague Later: bloating, pelvic pain, constipation, abdominal swelling, loss of appetite
- Usual onset: Usual age of diagnosis 63 years old
- Types: Ovarian origin: sex-cord stromal tumor, germ cell tumor; Non-ovarian origin: most epithelial ovarian cancers and epithelial–stromal ovarian tumors
- Risk factors: Never having children, hormone therapy after menopause, fertility medication, obesity, genetics
- Diagnostic method: Tissue biopsy
- Treatment: Surgery, chemotherapy, targeted therapy
- Prognosis: Five-year survival rate c. 52% (US)
- Frequency: 1.2 million (2015)
- Deaths: 161,100 (2015)

Video overview (script)

Ovarian cancer is a cancerous tumor of an ovary. It may originate from the ovary itself or more commonly from nearby structures such as fallopian tubes or the inner lining of the abdomen. The ovary is made up of three different cell types including epithelial cells, germ cells, and stromal cells. When these cells become abnormal, they can divide and form tumors. These cells can also invade or metastasize (spread) to other parts of the body. When this process begins, there may be no or only vague symptoms. Symptoms become more noticeable as the cancer progresses. These symptoms may include bloating, vaginal bleeding, pelvic pain, abdominal swelling, constipation, and loss of appetite, among others. Common areas to which the cancer may spread include the lining of the abdomen, lymph nodes, lungs, and liver.

The risk of ovarian cancer increases with age. Most cases of ovarian cancer develop after menopause. It is also more common in women who have ovulated more over their lifetime. This includes those who have never had children, those who began ovulation at a younger age and those who reach menopause at an older age. Other risk factors include hormone therapy after menopause, fertility medication, and obesity. Factors that decrease risk include hormonal birth control, tubal ligation, pregnancy, and breast feeding. About 10% of cases are related to inherited genetic risk; women with mutations in the genes BRCA1 or BRCA2 have about a 50% chance of developing the disease. Some family cancer syndromes, such as hereditary nonpolyposis colon cancer and Peutz-Jeghers syndrome, also increase the risk of developing ovarian cancer. Epithelial ovarian cancer is the most common type of ovarian cancer, comprising more than 90% of cases. There are five main subtypes of ovarian carcinoma, of which high-grade serous carcinoma (HGSC) is the most common. Less common types of ovarian cancer include germ cell tumors and sex cord stromal tumors. A diagnosis of ovarian cancer is confirmed through a biopsy of tissue, usually removed during surgery.

Screening is not recommended in women who are at average risk, as evidence does not support a reduction in death and the high rate of false positive tests may lead to unneeded surgery, which is accompanied by its own risks. Those at very high risk may have their ovaries removed as a preventive measure. If caught and treated in an early stage, ovarian cancer is often curable. Treatment usually includes some combination of surgery, radiation therapy, and chemotherapy. Outcomes depend on the extent of the disease, the subtype of cancer present, and other medical conditions. The overall five-year survival rate in the United States is 52%. Outcomes are worse in the developing world.

In 2020, new cases occurred in approximately 313,000 women. In 2019 it resulted in 13,445 deaths in the United States. Death from ovarian cancer increased globally between 1990 and 2017 by 84.2%. Ovarian cancer is the second-most common gynecologic cancer in the United States. It causes more deaths than any other cancer of the female reproductive system. Among women, it ranks fifth in cancer-related deaths. The typical age of diagnosis is 63. Death from ovarian cancer is more common in North America and Europe than in Africa and Asia. In the United States, it is more common in White and Hispanic women than Black or American Indian women.

== Signs and symptoms ==
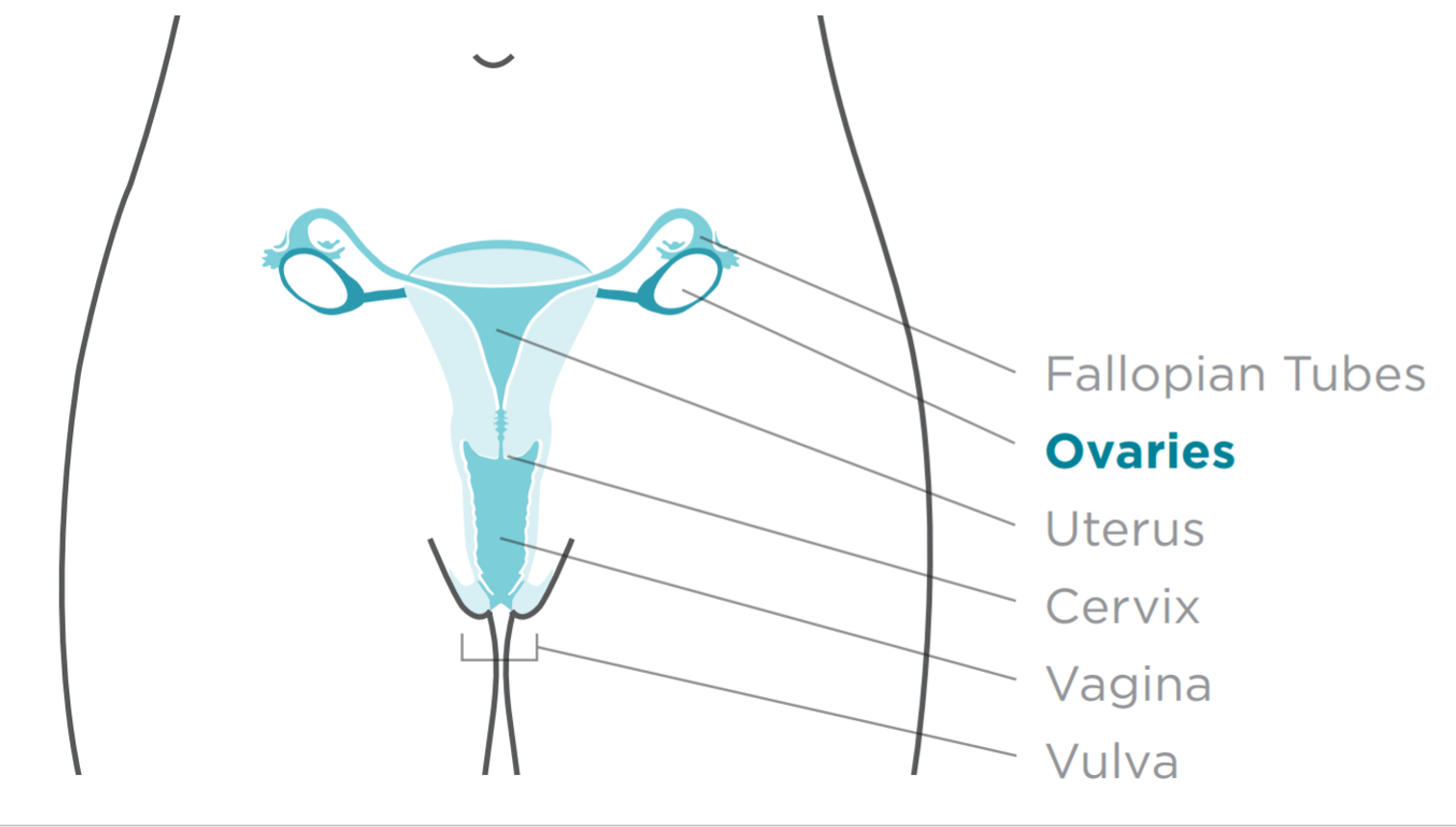
Site of ovarian cancer

Early signs and symptoms of ovarian cancer may be absent or subtle. As tumors grow and spread, they put pressure on surround organs causing symptoms. Before diagonsis, 95% of women experience abdominal symptoms such as abdominal pain, bloating, and issues with urination. In most cases, symptoms exist for several months before being recognized and diagnosed. Symptoms can vary based on the subtype.

Ovarian borderline tumors, also known as low malignant potential (LMP) ovarian tumors, do not cause an increase in CA125 levels and are not identifiable with an ultrasound. The typical symptoms of an LMP tumor can include abdominal distension or pelvic pain. Particularly large masses tend to be benign or borderline.

The most typical symptoms of ovarian cancer include bloating, abdominal or pelvic pain or discomfort, back pain, irregular menstruation or postmenopausal vaginal bleeding, pain or bleeding after or during sexual intercourse, loss of appetite, fatigue, diarrhea, indigestion, heartburn, constipation, nausea, feeling full, and possibly urinary symptoms (including frequent urination and urgent urination).

=== Later symptoms ===
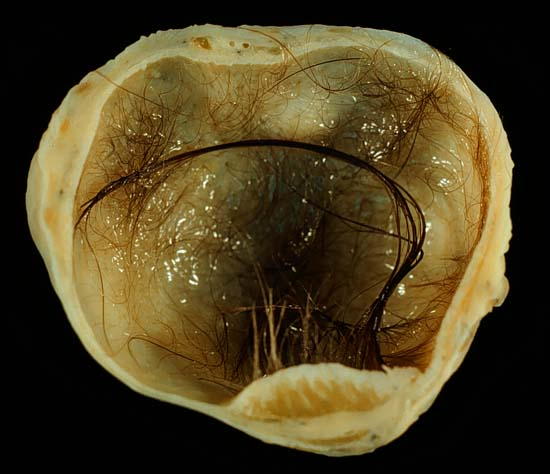
Mature cystic teratoma of ovary

Later symptoms of ovarian cancer are due to the growing mass, causing pain by pressing on other abdominopelvic organs or from metastases. Because of the anatomic location of the ovaries deep in the pelvis, most masses are large and advanced at the time of diagnosis. The growing mass may cause pain if ovarian torsion develops. If these symptoms start to occur more often or more severely than usual, especially after no significant history of such symptoms, ovarian cancer is considered. Metastases may cause a Sister Mary Joseph nodule. Rarely, teratomas can cause growing teratoma syndrome or peritoneal gliomatosis. Some experience menometrorrhagia and abnormal vaginal bleeding after menopause in most cases. Other common symptoms include hirsutism, abdominal pain, virilization, and an adnexal mass.

=== Children ===
In adolescents or children with ovarian tumors, symptoms can include severe abdominal pain, irritation of the peritoneum, or bleeding. Sex cord stromal tumors produce hormones that can lead to the premature development of secondary sex characteristics. Sex cord-stromal tumors in prepubertal children may be manifested by signs of early puberty; abdominal pain and distension are also common. Adolescents with sex cord-stromal tumors may experience amenorrhea. As the cancer becomes more advanced, it can cause an accumulation of fluid in the abdomen and lead to distension. If the malignancy has not been diagnosed by the time it causes ascites, it is typically diagnosed shortly thereafter. Advanced cancers can also cause abdominal masses, lymph node masses, or pleural effusion.

== Risk factors ==
Many known risk factors may increase a woman's risk of developing ovarian cancer. The risk of developing ovarian cancer is related to the amount of time a woman spends ovulating. Factors that increase the number of ovulatory cycles a woman undergoes may increase the risk of developing ovarian cancer. During ovulation, cells are stimulated to divide. If this division is abnormally regulated, tumors may form, which can be malignant. Early menarche and late menopause increase the number of ovulatory cycles a woman undergoes in her lifetime, and so increase the risk of developing ovarian cancer. Since ovulation is suppressed during pregnancy, not having children also increases the risk of ovarian cancer. Therefore, women who have not borne children are at twice the risk of ovarian cancer than those who have. Both obesity and hormone replacement therapy also raise the risk.

The risk of developing ovarian cancer is less for women who have fewer menstrual cycles, no menstrual cycles, breastfeeding, take oral contraceptives, have multiple pregnancies, and have a pregnancy at an early age. The risk of developing ovarian cancer is reduced in women who have had tubal ligation (colloquially known as having one's "tubes tied"), both ovaries removed, or hysterectomy (an operation in which the uterus is removed). Age is also a risk factor. Non-genetic factors such as diabetes mellitus, high body mass index, and tobacco use are also risk factors for ovarian cancer.

=== Hormones ===
The use of fertility medication may contribute to ovarian borderline tumor formation, but the link between the two is disputed and difficult to study. Fertility drugs may be associated with a higher risk of borderline tumors. Those who have been treated for infertility but remain nulliparous are at higher risk for epithelial ovarian cancer due to hormonal exposure that may lead to proliferation of cells. However, those who are successfully treated for infertility and subsequently give birth are at no higher risk. This may be due to shedding of precancerous cells during pregnancy, but the cause remains unclear. The risk factor may instead be infertility itself, not the treatment.

Hormonal conditions such as polyendocrine metabolic ovarian syndrome (PMOS) and endometriosis are associated with ovarian cancer, but the link is not completely confirmed. Postmenopausal hormone replacement therapy (HRT) with estrogen likely increases the risk of ovarian cancer. The association has not been confirmed in a large-scale study, but notable studies including the Million Women Study have supported this link. Postmenopausal HRT with combined estrogen and progesterone may increase contemporaneous risk if used for over 5 years, but this risk returns to normal after cessation of therapy. Estrogen HRT with or without progestins increases the risk of endometrioid and serous tumors but lowers the risk of mucinous tumors. Higher doses of estrogen increase this risk. Endometriosis is another risk factor for ovarian cancer, as is pain with menstruation. Endometriosis is associated with clear-cell and endometrioid subtypes, low-grade serous tumors, stage I and II tumors, grade 1 tumors, and lower mortality. Ovarian cancer, which coexists with endometriosis, is known as endometriosis-associated ovarian cancer. The presence of transitional lesions (atypical endometriosis, borderline tumors) linking endometriosis to its malignant transformation is termed endometriosis-correlated ovarian cancer. The simple presence of endometriosis and ovarian cancer without the proof of transition is termed endometriosis-incidental ovarian cancer.

Before menopause, obesity can increase a person's risk of ovarian cancer, but this risk is not present after menopause. This risk is also relevant in those who are both obese and have never used HRT. A similar association with ovarian cancer appears in taller women.

=== Genetics ===
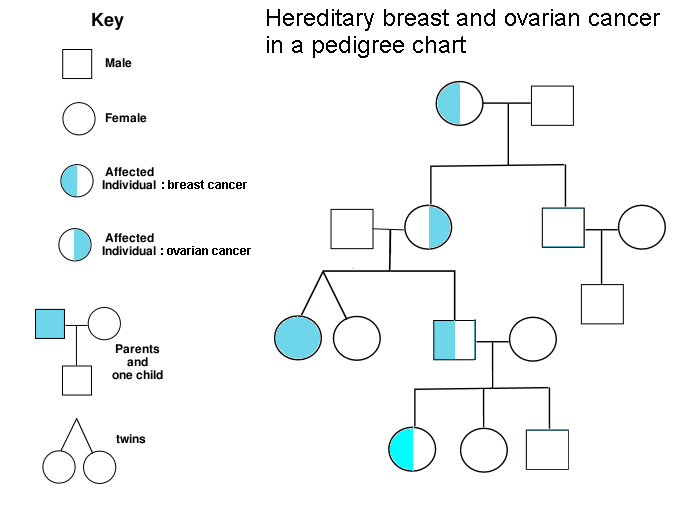
Women with ovarian or breast cancer in a pedigree chart of a family

A family history of ovarian cancer is a risk factor for ovarian cancer. Women with hereditary nonpolyposis colon cancer (Lynch syndrome), and those with BRCA-1 and BRCA-2 genetic abnormalities, are at increased risk.

The major genetic risk factor for ovarian cancer is a mutation in the BRCA1 or BRCA2 genes, or in DNA mismatch repair genes, which is present in 10% of ovarian cancer cases. Only one allele needs to be mutated to place a person at high risk. The gene can be inherited through either the maternal or paternal line, but has variable penetrance. Though mutations in these genes are usually associated with increased risk of breast cancer, they also carry a substantial lifetime risk of ovarian cancer. This risk peaks in a person's 40s and 50s. The lowest risk cited is 30% and the highest 60%. Mutations in BRCA1 have a lifetime risk of developing ovarian cancer of 15–45%. Mutations in BRCA2 are less risky than those with BRCA1, with a lifetime risk of 10% (lowest risk cited) to 40% (highest risk cited). On average, BRCA-associated cancers develop 15 years before their sporadic counterparts because people who inherit the mutations on one copy of their gene only need one mutation to start the process of carcinogenesis. People with two normal genes would need to acquire two mutations.

In the United States, five of 100 women with a first-degree relative with ovarian cancer will eventually get ovarian cancer themselves, placing those with affected family members at triple the risk of women with unaffected family members. Seven of 100 women with two or more relatives with ovarian cancer will eventually get ovarian cancer. In general, 5–10% of ovarian cancer cases have a genetic cause. BRCA mutations are associated with high-grade serous nonmucinous epithelial ovarian cancer.

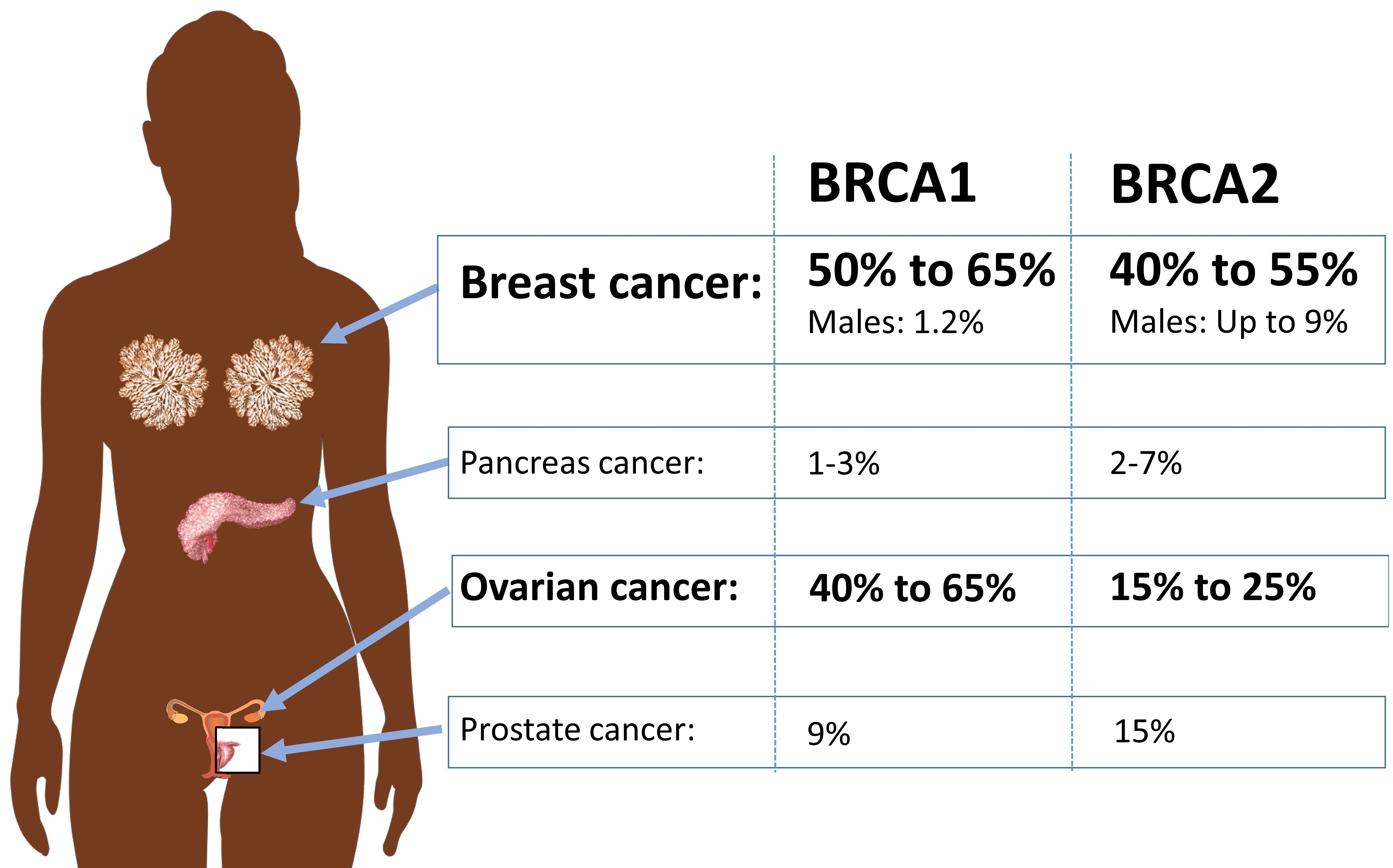
BRCA1 and BRCA2 mutations and absolute cancer risk

A strong family history of endometrial cancer, colon cancer, or other gastrointestinal cancers may indicate the presence of a syndrome known as hereditary nonpolyposis colorectal cancer (also known as Lynch syndrome), which confers a higher risk for developing several cancers, including ovarian cancer. Lynch syndrome is caused by mutations in mismatch repair genes, including MSH2, MLH1, MLH6, PMS1, and PMS2. The risk of ovarian cancer for an individual with Lynch syndrome is between 10 and 12 percent. Women of Icelandic descent, European Jewish descent/Ashkenazi Jewish descent, and Hungarian descent are at higher risk for epithelial ovarian cancer. Estrogen receptor beta gene (ESR2) seems to be a key to pathogenesis and response to therapy. Other genes that have been associated with ovarian cancer are BRIP1, MSH6, RAD51C and RAD51D. CDH1, CHEK2, PALB2 and RAD50 have also been associated with ovarian cancer.

Several rare genetic disorders are associated with specific subtypes of ovarian cancer. Peutz–Jeghers syndrome, a rare genetic disorder, also predisposes women to sex cord tumour with annular tubules. Ollier disease and Maffucci syndrome are associated with granulosa cell tumors in children and may also be associated with Sertoli-Leydig tumors. Benign fibromas are associated with nevoid basal cell carcinoma syndrome.

=== Diet ===
Alcohol consumption does not appear to be related to ovarian cancer.

The American Cancer Society recommends a healthy eating pattern that includes plenty of fruits, vegetables, whole grains, and a diet that avoids or limits red and processed meats and processed sugar. High consumption of total, saturated, and trans-fats increases ovarian cancer risk. A 2021 umbrella review found that coffee, egg, and fat intake significantly increases the risk of ovarian cancer. There is mixed evidence from studies on ovarian cancer risk and consumption of dairy products.

=== Environmental factors ===
An awareness video about Ovarian Cancer

Industrialized nations, except Japan, have high rates of epithelial ovarian cancer, which may be due to diet in those countries. White women are at a 30–40% higher risk for ovarian cancer when compared to Black women and Hispanic women, likely due to socioeconomic factors; white women tend to have fewer children and different rates of gynecologic surgeries that affect risk for ovarian cancer.

Tentative evidence suggests that talc, pesticides, and herbicides increase the risk of ovarian cancer. The American Cancer Society notes that as of now, no study has been able to accurately link any single chemical in the environment, or in the human diet, directly to mutations that cause ovarian cancer.

=== Other ===
Other factors that have been investigated, such as smoking, low levels of vitamin D in the blood, presence of inclusion ovarian cysts, and infection with human papilloma virus (the cause of some cases of cervical cancer), have been disproven as risk factors for ovarian cancer. The carcinogenicity of perineal talc is controversial, because it can act as an irritant if it travels through the reproductive tract to the ovaries. Case-control studies have shown that use of perineal talc does increase the risk of ovarian cancer, but using talc more often does not create a greater risk. Use of talc elsewhere on the body is unrelated to ovarian cancer. Sitting regularly for prolonged periods is associated with higher mortality from epithelial ovarian cancer. The risk is not negated by regular exercise, though it is lowered.

Increased age (up to the 70s) is a risk factor for epithelial ovarian cancer because more mutations in cells can accumulate and eventually cause cancer. Those over 80 are at slightly lower risk.

Smoking tobacco is associated with a higher risk of mucinous ovarian cancer; after smoking cessation, the risk eventually returns to normal. Higher levels of C-reactive protein are associated with a higher risk of developing ovarian cancer.

=== Protective factors ===
Suppression of ovulation, which would otherwise cause damage to the ovarian surface epithelium and, consequently, inflammation, is generally protective. This effect can be achieved by having children, taking combined oral contraceptives, and breastfeeding, all of which are protective factors. A longer period of breastfeeding correlates with a larger decrease in the risk of ovarian cancer. Each birth decreases the risk of ovarian cancer more, and this effect is seen with up to five births. Combined oral contraceptives reduce the risk of ovarian cancer by up to 50%, and the protective effect of combined oral contraceptives can last 25–30 years after they are discontinued. Regular use of aspirin or acetaminophen (paracetamol) may be associated with a lower risk of ovarian cancer; other NSAIDs do not seem to have a similar protective effect.

Tubal ligation is protective because carcinogens are unable to reach the ovary and fimbriae via the vagina, uterus, and Fallopian tubes. Tubal ligation is also protective in women with the BRCA1 mutation, but not the BRCA2 mutation. Hysterectomy reduces the risk, and removal of both Fallopian tubes and ovaries (bilateral salpingo-oophorectomy) dramatically reduces the risk of not only ovarian cancer but breast cancer as well. This is still a topic of research, as the link between hysterectomy and lower ovarian cancer risk is controversial. The reasons that hysterectomy may be protective have not been elucidated as of 2015.

A diet that includes large amounts of carotene, fiber, and vitamins with low amounts of fat—specifically, a diet with non-starchy vegetables (e.g. broccoli and onions) may be protective. Dietary fiber is associated with a significantly reduced risk of ovarian cancer. A 2021 review found that green leafy vegetables, allium vegetables, fiber, flavanoids and green tea intake can significantly reduce ovarian cancer risk.

== Pathophysiology ==
Mutations found in ovarian cancer subtypes
Gene mutated	Mutation type	Subtype	Prevalence
AKT1	amplification		3%
AKT2	amplification/mutation		6%, 20%
ARID1A	point mutation	endometrioid and clear-cell	
BECN1	deletion		
BRAF	point mutation	low-grade serous	0.5%
BRCA1	nonsense mutation	high-grade serous	5%
BRCA2	frameshift mutation	high-grade serous	3%
CCND1	amplification		4%
CCND2	upregulation		15%
CCNE1	amplification		20%
CDK12		high-grade serous	
CDKN2A	downregulation (30%) and deletion (2%)		32%
CTNNB1		clear-cell	
DICER1	missense mutation (somatic)	nonepithelial	29%
DYNLRB1 (km23)	mutation		42%
EGFR	amplification/overexpression		20%
ERBB2 (Her2/neu)	amplification/overexpression	mucinous and low-grade serous	30%
FMS	coexpression with CSF-1		50%
FOXL2	point mutation (402 C to G)	adult granulosa cell	~100%
JAG1	amplification		2%
JAG2	amplification		3%
KRAS	amplification	mucinous and low-grade serous	11%
MAML1	amplification and point mutation		2%
MAML2	amplification and point mutation		4%
MAML3	amplification		2%
MLH1			1%
NF1	deletion (8%) and point mutation (4%)	high-grade serous	12%
NOTCH3	amplification and point mutation		11%
NRAS		low-grade serous	
PIK3C3 (PI3K3)	amplification/mutation		12–20%
PIK3CA	amplification	endometrioid and clear-cell	18%
PPP2R1A		endometrioid and clear-cell	
PTEN	deletion	endometrioid and clear-cell	7%
RB1	deletion (8%) and point mutation (2%)		10%
TGF-β	mutation/overexpression		12%
TP53	mutation/overexpression	high-grade serous	20–50%
TβRI	mutation		33%
TβRII	mutation		25%
USP36	overexpression		

Ovarian cancer forms when errors in normal ovarian cell growth occur. Usually, when cells grow old or get damaged, they die, and new cells take their place. Cancer starts when new cells form unnecessarily, and old or damaged cells do not die as they should. The buildup of extra cells often forms a mass of tissue called an ovarian tumor or growth. These abnormal cancer cells have many genetic abnormalities that cause them to grow excessively. When an ovary releases an egg, the egg follicle bursts open and becomes the corpus luteum. This structure needs to be repaired by dividing the cells in the ovary. Continuous ovulation for a long time means more repair of the ovary by dividing cells, which can acquire mutations in each division.

Overall, the most common gene mutations in ovarian cancer occur in NF1, BRCA1, BRCA2, and CDK12. Type I ovarian cancers, which tend to be less aggressive, tend to have microsatellite instability in several genes, including both oncogenes (most notably BRAF and KRAS) and tumor suppressors (most notably PTEN). The most common mutations in Type I cancers are KRAS, BRAF, ERBB2, PTEN, PIK3CA, and ARID1A. Type II cancers, the more aggressive type, have different genes mutated, including p53, BRCA1, and BRCA2. Low-grade cancers tend to have mutations in KRAS, whereas cancers of any grade that develop from low malignant potential tumors tend to have mutations in p53. Type I cancers tend to develop from precursor lesions, whereas Type II cancers can develop from a serous tubal intraepithelial carcinoma. Serous cancers that have BRCA mutations also inevitably have p53 mutations, indicating that the removal of both functional genes is important for cancer to develop.

In 50% of high-grade serous cancers, homologous recombination DNA repair is dysfunctional, as are the notch and FOXM1 signaling pathways. They also almost always have p53 mutations. Other than this, mutations in high-grade serous carcinoma are hard to characterize beyond their high degree of genomic instability. BRCA1 and BRCA2 are essential for homologous recombination DNA repair, and germline mutations in these genes are found in about 15% of women with ovarian cancer. The most common mutations in BRCA1 and BRCA2 are the frameshift mutations that originated in a small founding population of Ashkenazi Jews.

Almost 100% of rare mucinous carcinomas have mutations in KRAS and amplifications of ERBB2 (also known as Her2/neu). Overall, 20% of ovarian cancers have mutations in Her2/neu.

Serous carcinomas may develop from serous tubal intraepithelial carcinoma, rather than developing spontaneously from ovarian tissue. Other carcinomas develop from cortical inclusion cysts, which are groups of epithelial ovarian cells inside the stroma.

== Diagnosis ==
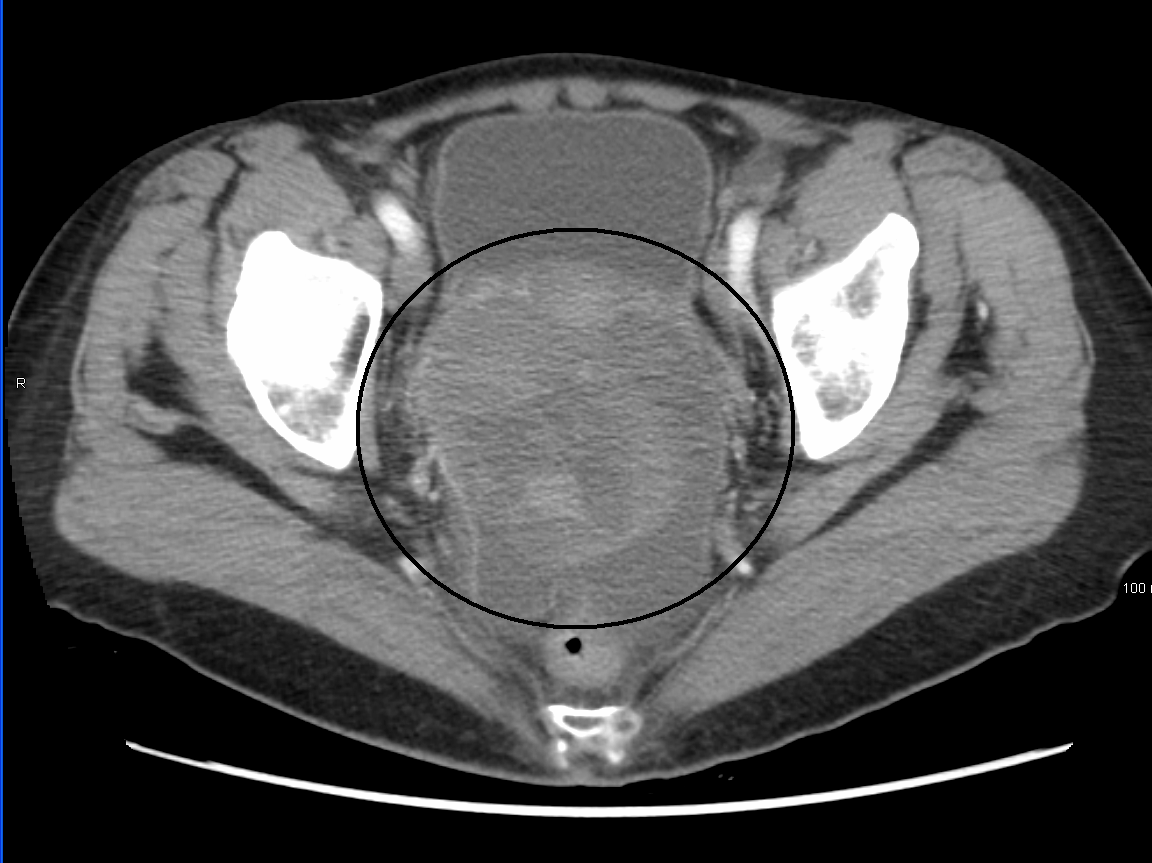
A very large ovarian cancer as seen on CT

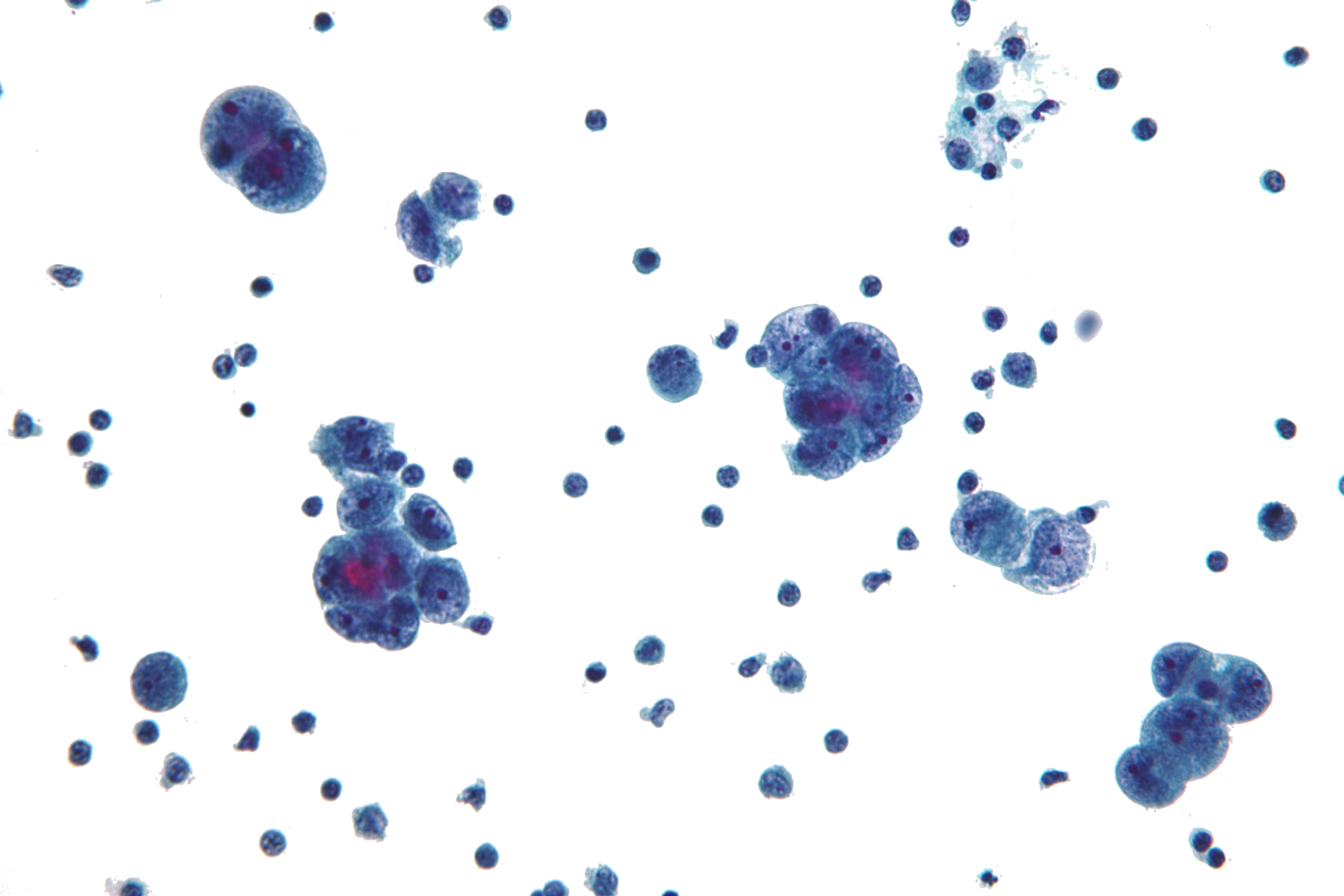
Micrograph of serous carcinoma, a type of ovarian cancer, diagnosed in peritoneal fluid

Diagnosis of ovarian cancer starts with a physical examination (including a pelvic examination), a blood test (for CA-125 and sometimes other markers), and transvaginal ultrasound. Sometimes a rectovaginal examination is used to help plan a surgery. The diagnosis must be confirmed with surgery to inspect the abdominal cavity, take biopsies (tissue samples for microscopic analysis), and look for cancer cells in the abdominal fluid. This helps to determine if an ovarian mass is benign or malignant.

A physical examination, including a pelvic examination, and a pelvic ultrasound (transvaginal or otherwise) are both essential for diagnosis: physical examination may reveal increased abdominal girth and/or ascites (fluid within the abdominal cavity). Pelvic examination may reveal an ovarian or abdominal mass. An adnexal mass is a significant finding that often indicates ovarian cancer, especially if it is fixed, nodular, irregular, solid, and/or bilateral. 13–21% of adnexal masses are caused by malignancy; however, there are other benign causes of adnexal masses, including ovarian follicular cyst, leiomyoma, endometriosis, ectopic pregnancy, hydrosalpinx, tuboovarian abscess, ovarian torsion, dermoid cyst, cystadenoma (serous or mucinous), diverticular or appendiceal abscess, nerve sheath tumor, pelvic kidney, ureteral or bladder diverticulum, benign cystic mesothelioma of the peritoneum, peritoneal tuberculosis, or paraovarian cyst. Ovaries that can be felt are also a sign of ovarian cancer in postmenopausal women. Other parts of a physical examination for suspected ovarian cancer can include a breast examination and a digital rectal exam. Palpation of the supraclavicular, axillary, and inguinal lymph nodes may reveal lymphadenopathy, which can be indicative of metastasis. Another indicator may be the presence of a pleural effusion, which can be noted on auscultation.

When an ovarian malignancy is included in a list of diagnostic possibilities, a limited number of laboratory tests are indicated. A complete blood count and serum electrolyte test is usually obtained; when an ovarian cancer is present, these tests often show a high number of platelets (20–25% of patients) and low blood sodium levels due to chemical signals secreted by the tumor. A positive test for inhibin A and inhibin B can indicate a granulosa cell tumor.

A blood test for a marker molecule called CA-125 is useful in differential diagnosis and follow-up of the disease. By itself, it is not an effective method to screen for early-stage ovarian cancer due to its very low sensitivity and specificity. CA-125 levels in premenopausal women over 200 U/mL may indicate ovarian cancer, as may any elevation in CA-125 above 35 U/mL in post-menopausal women. CA-125 levels are not accurate in early stage ovarian cancer, as half of stage I ovarian cancer patients have a normal CA-125 level. CA-125 may also be elevated in benign (non-cancerous) conditions, including endometriosis, pregnancy, uterine fibroids, menstruation, ovarian cysts, systemic lupus erythematosus, liver disease, inflammatory bowel disease, pelvic inflammatory disease, and leiomyoma. HE4 is another candidate for ovarian cancer testing. It has not been extensively tested. Other tumor markers for ovarian cancer include CA19-9, CA72-4, CA15-3, immunosuppressive acidic protein, haptoglobin-alpha, OVX1, mesothelin, lysophosphatidic acid, osteopontin, and fibroblast growth factor 23.

The use of blood test panels may help in diagnosis. The OVA1 panel includes CA-125, beta-2 microglobulin, transferrin, apolipoprotein A1, and transthyretin. OVA1 above 5.0 in premenopausal women and 4.4 in postmenopausal women indicates a high risk for cancer. A different set of laboratory tests is used for detecting sex cord-stromal tumors. High levels of testosterone or dehydroepiandrosterone sulfate, combined with other symptoms and high levels of inhibin A and inhibin B, can be indicative of an SCST of any type.

In women in whom pregnancy is a possibility, BHCG level can be measured during the diagnosis process. Serum alpha-fetoprotein, neuron-specific enolase, and lactate dehydrogenase can be measured in young girls and adolescents with suspected ovarian tumors, as younger women with ovarian cancer are more likely to have malignant germ cell tumors.

Current research is examining tumor marker proteomics in combination with other indicators of disease (i.e., radiology and/or symptoms) to improve diagnostic accuracy. The challenge in such an approach is that the disparate prevalence of ovarian cancer means that even testing with very high sensitivity and specificity will still lead to some false positive results, which in turn may lead to issues such as performing surgical procedures in which cancer is not found intraoperatively. Genomics approaches have not yet been developed for ovarian cancer.

CT scanning is preferred to assess the extent of the tumor in the abdominopelvic cavity, though magnetic resonance imaging can also be used. CT scanning can also be useful for finding omental caking or differentiating fluid from solid tumor in the abdomen, especially in low malignant potential tumors. However, it may not detect smaller tumors. Sometimes, a chest x-ray is used to detect metastases in the chest or pleural effusion. Another test for metastatic disease, though it is infrequently used, is a barium enema, which can show if the rectosigmoid colon is involved in the disease. Positron emission tomography, bone scans, and paracentesis are of limited use; in fact, paracentesis can cause metastases to form at the needle insertion site and may not provide useful results. However, paracentesis can be used in cases where there is no pelvic mass and ascites is still present. A physician suspecting ovarian cancer may also perform mammography or an endometrial biopsy (in the case of abnormal bleeding) to assess the possibility of breast malignancies and endometrial malignancy, respectively. Vaginal ultrasonography is often the first-line imaging study performed when an adnexal mass is found. Several characteristics of an adnexal mass indicate ovarian malignancy; they usually are solid, irregular, multilocular, and/or large; and they typically have papillary features, central vessels, and/or irregular internal septations. However, SCST has no definitive characteristics on radiographic study.

To definitively diagnose ovarian cancer, a surgical procedure to inspect the abdomen is required. This can be an open procedure (laparotomy, incision through the abdominal wall) or keyhole surgery (laparoscopy). During this procedure, suspicious tissue is removed and sent for microscopic analysis. Usually, this includes a unilateral salpingo-oophorectomy, removal of a single affected ovary and Fallopian tube. Fluid from the abdominal cavity can also be analyzed for cancerous cells. If cancer is found, this procedure can also be used to determine the extent of its spread (which is a form of tumor staging).

Pafolacianine is indicated for use in adults with ovarian cancer to help identify cancerous lesions during surgery. It is a diagnostic agent that is administered in the form of an intravenous injection before surgery.

==== Risk scoring ====
A widely recognized method of estimating the risk of malignant ovarian cancer is the risk of malignancy index (RMI), calculated based on an initial workup. An RMI score of over 200 or 250 is generally felt to indicate high risk for ovarian cancer.

The RMI is calculated as:

RMI = ultrasound score × menopausal score x CA-125 level in U/ml.

Two methods can be used to determine the ultrasound score and menopausal score, with the resultant scores being referred to as RMI 1 and RMI 2, respectively, depending on which method is used.

Feature	RMI 1	RMI 2
Ultrasound abnormalities: multilocular cyst; solid areas; ascites; intra-abdominal metastases	0 = no abnormality; 1 = one abnormality; 3 = two or more abnormalities	0 = none; 1 = one abnormality; 4 = two or more abnormalities
Menopausal score	1 = premenopausal; 3 = postmenopausal	1 = premenopausal; 4 = postmenopausal
CA-125	Quantity in U/ml	Quantity in U/ml

Another method for quantifying the risk of ovarian cancer is the Risk of Ovarian Cancer Algorithm (ROCA), which observes levels over time and determines if they are increasing rapidly enough to warrant a transvaginal ultrasound. The Risk of Ovarian Malignancy algorithm uses CA-125 levels and HE4 levels to calculate the risk of ovarian cancer; it may be more effective than RMI. The IOTA models can be used to estimate the probability that an adnexal tumor is malignant. They include the LR2 risk model, The Simple Rules risk (SRrisk) calculation and Assessment of Different Neoplasias in the Adnexa (ADNEX) model that can be used to assess the risk of malignancy in an adnexal mass, based on its characteristics and risk factors. The QCancer (Ovary) algorithm is used to predict the likelihood of ovarian cancer from risk factors.

=== Pathology ===
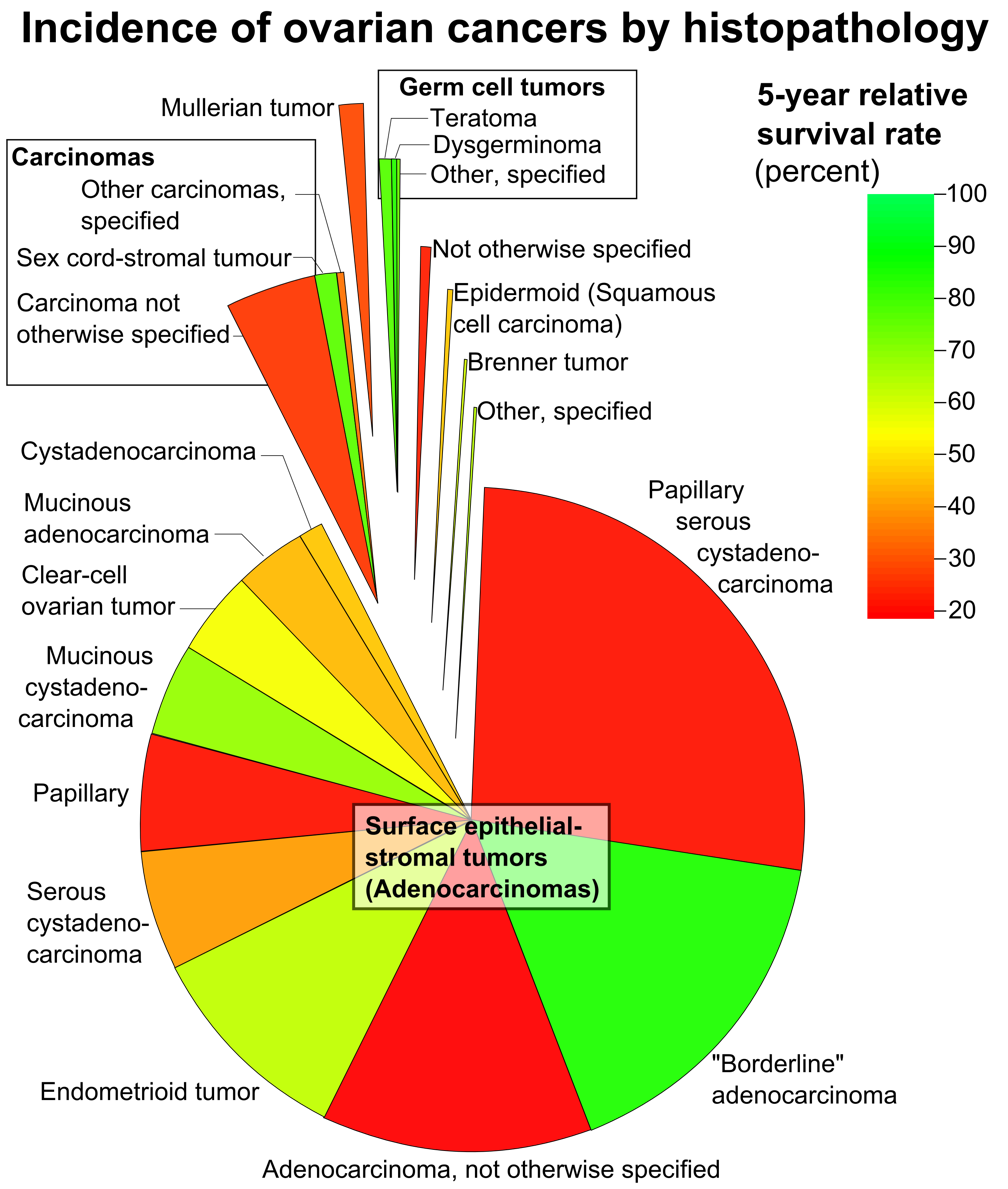
Primary ovarian cancers in women aged 20+, with area representing relative incidence and color representing five-year relative survival rate

Ovarian cancers are classified according to the microscopic appearance of their structures (histology or histopathology). Histology dictates many aspects of clinical treatment, management, and prognosis. The gross pathology of ovarian cancers is very similar regardless of histologic type: ovarian tumors have solid and cystic masses. According to SEER, the types of ovarian cancers in women age 20 and over are:

Percent of ovarian cancers in women age 20+	Percent of ovarian cancers in women age 20+ by subdivision	Histology	Five-year RSR
89.7		Surface epithelial-stromal tumor (adenocarcinoma)	54.4
	26.4	Papillary serous cystadenocarcinoma	21.0
	15.9	Borderline adenocarcinoma (underestimated - short data collection interval)	98.2
	12.6	Adenocarcinoma, not otherwise specified	18.3
	9.8	Endometrioid tumor	70.9
	5.8	Serous cystadenocarcinoma	44.2
	5.5	Papillary	21.0
	4.2	Mucinous cystadenocarcinoma	77.7
	4.0	Ovarian clear-cell carcinoma	61.5
	3.4	Mucinous adenocarcinoma	49.1
	1.3	Cystadenocarcinoma	50.7
5.5		Carcinoma	
	4.1	Carcinoma not otherwise specified	26.8
	1.1	Sex cord-stromal tumor	87.8
	0.3	Other carcinomas, specified	37.3
1.7		Müllerian tumor	29.8
1.5		Germ cell tumor	91.0
	0.8	Teratoma	89.1
	0.5	Dysgerminoma	96.8
	0.3	Other, specified	85.1
0.6		Not otherwise specified	23.0
0.5		Ovarian squamous cell carcinoma (Epidermoid)	51.3
0.2		Brenner tumor	67.9
0.2		Other, specified	71.7

Ovarian cancers are histologically and genetically divided into type I or type II. Type I cancers are of low histological grade and include endometrioid, mucinous, and clear-cell carcinomas. Type II cancers are of higher histological grade and include serous carcinoma and carcinosarcoma.

==== Epithelial carcinoma ====
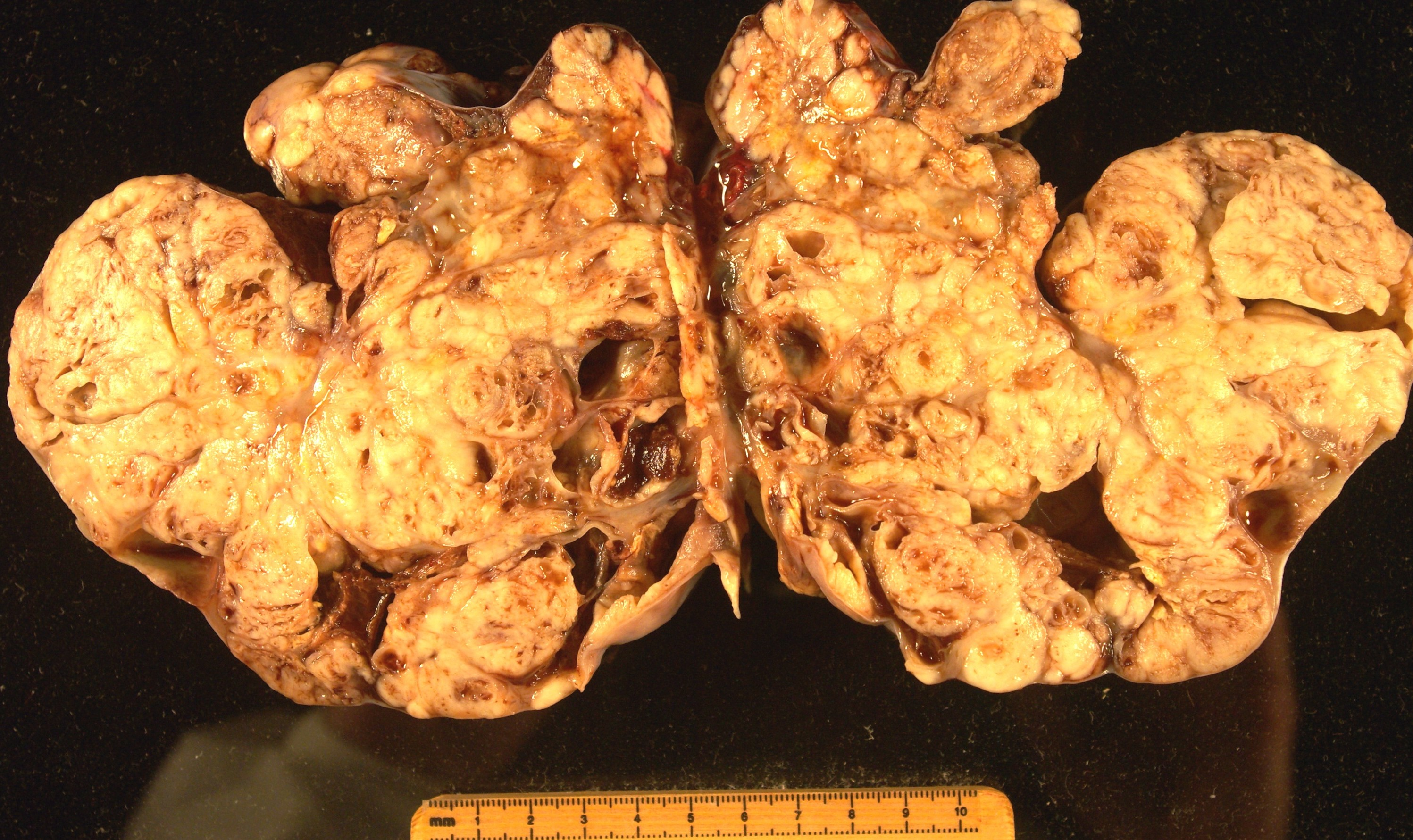
A pathological specimen of ovarian carcinoma

Epithelial ovarian cancer typically presents at an advanced stage and is derived from the malignant transformation of the epithelium of the ovarian surface, peritoneum, or fallopian tube. It is the most common cause of gynecologic cancer death. There are various types of epithelial ovarian cancer, including serous tumor, endometrioid tumor, clear-cell tumor, mucinous tumor, and undifferentiated or unclassified tumors. Annually worldwide, 230,000 women will be diagnosed and 150,000 will die. It has a 46% 5 year survival rate after diagnosis because of the advanced stage of the disease at the time of diagnosis. Typically, around 75% of patients are diagnosed as having an advanced stage of the disease because of the asymptomatic nature of its presentation. There is a genomic predisposition to epithelial ovarian cancer and the BRCA1 and BRCA2 genes have been found to be the causative genes in 65–75% of hereditary epithelial ovarian cancer.

===== Serous carcinoma =====
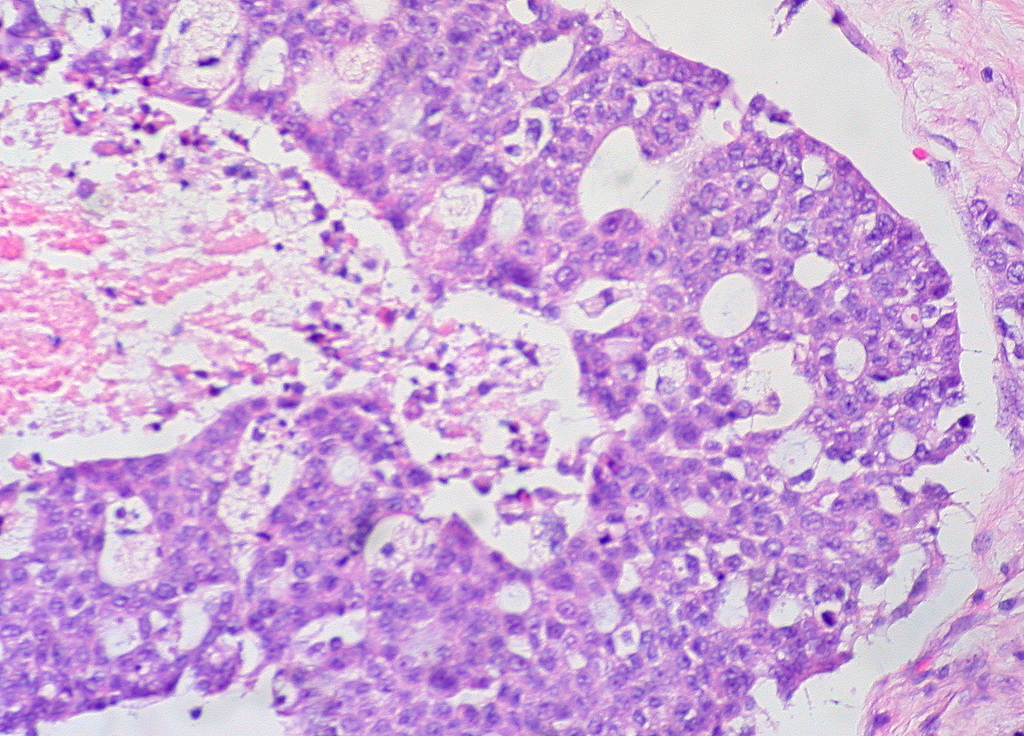
Serous carcinoma of ovary

Serous ovarian cancer is the most common type of epithelial ovarian cancer and it accounts for about two-thirds of cases of epithelial ovarian cancer. Low-grade serous carcinoma is less aggressive than high-grade serous carcinomas, though it does not typically respond well to chemotherapy or hormonal treatments. Serous carcinomas are thought to begin in the Fallopian tube. High grade serous carcinoma accounts for 75% of all epithelial ovarian cancer. About 15–20% of high grade serous carcinoma have germline BRCA1 and BRCA2 mutations. Histologically, the growth pattern of high grade serous carcinoma is heterogenous and has some papillary or solid growth patterns. The tumor cells are atypical with large, irregular nuclei. It has a high proliferation rate. 50% of the time, serous carcinomas are bilateral, and in 85% of cases, they have spread beyond the ovary at the time of diagnosis.

Serous Tubal Intraepithelial Carcinoma (STIC) is now recognized to be the precursor lesion of most so-called ovarian high-grade serous carcinomas. STIC is characterised by

1. Abnormal p53 staining
2. Ki67 proliferation index in excess of 10%
3. Positive WT1 (to exclude metastases)

===== Small-cell carcinoma =====
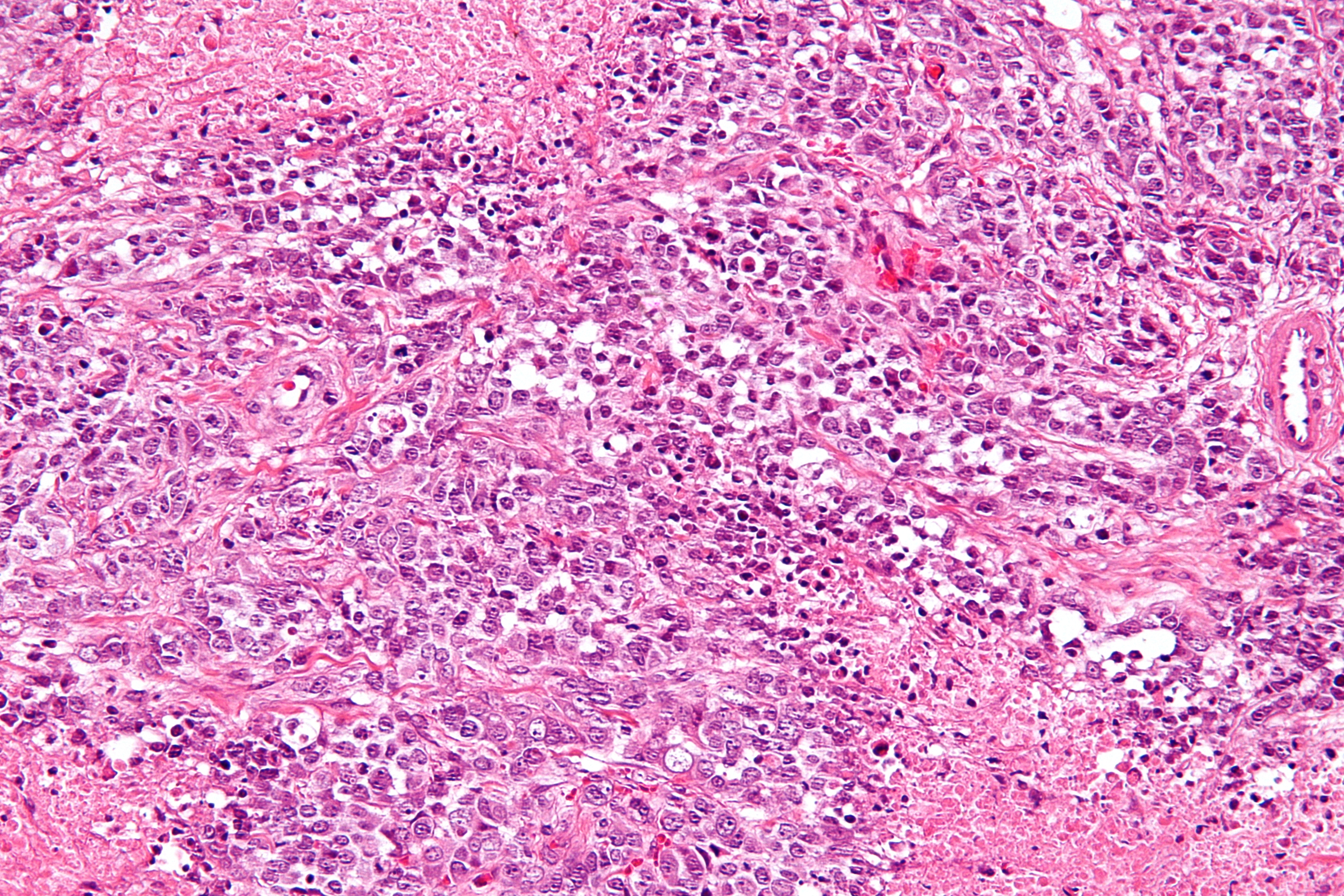
Small cell carcinoma of the ovary, hypercalcemic subtype

Small-cell ovarian carcinoma is rare and aggressive, with two main subtypes: hypercalcemic and pulmonary. This rare malignancy most commonly affects young women under the age of 40 years old with a range between 14 months and 58 years. The mean age of diagnosis of 24 years. Approximately two-thirds of patients will present with paraneoplastic hypercalcemia meaning they have high blood calcium levels for an unknown reason. The tumor secretes Parathyroid hormone related protein which acts similarly to PTH and binds PTH receptors in the bone and kidney causing hypercalcemia. Recent research has found an inactivating germline and somatic mutation of SMARCA4 gene. The hypercalcemic subtype is very aggressive and has an overall survival rate of 16% with a recurrence rate of 65% in patients who receive treatment. Patients who have spread of the disease to other parts of the body tend to die 2 years after the diagnosis. Extra-ovarian spread is involved in 50% of cases and lymph node spread is present in 55% of cases. The most common initial presentation is a rapidly growing unilateral pelvic mass with a mean size of 15 cm. Histologically, it is characterized by many sheets of small, round, tightly packed cells with clusters, nests, and cords. Immunohistochemistry is typically positive for vimentin, cytokeratin, CD10, p53, and WT-1.

Small-cell ovarian carcinoma of the pulmonary subtype presents differently from the hypercalcemic subtype. Typically, pulmonary small cell ovarian cancer usually affects both ovaries of older women and looks like oat-cell carcinoma of the lung. The average age of disease onset is 59 years, and approximately 45% of cases are bilateral for the pulmonary subtype. Additionally, several hormones can be elevated in the pulmonary subtype, including serotonin, somatostatin, insulin, gastrin, and calcitonin.

====== Primary peritoneal carcinoma ======
Primary peritoneal carcinomas develop from the peritoneum, a membrane that covers the abdominal cavity that has the same embryonic origin as the ovary. They are often discussed and classified with ovarian cancers when they affect the ovary. They can develop even after the ovaries have been removed and may appear similar to mesothelioma.

===== Clear-cell carcinoma =====
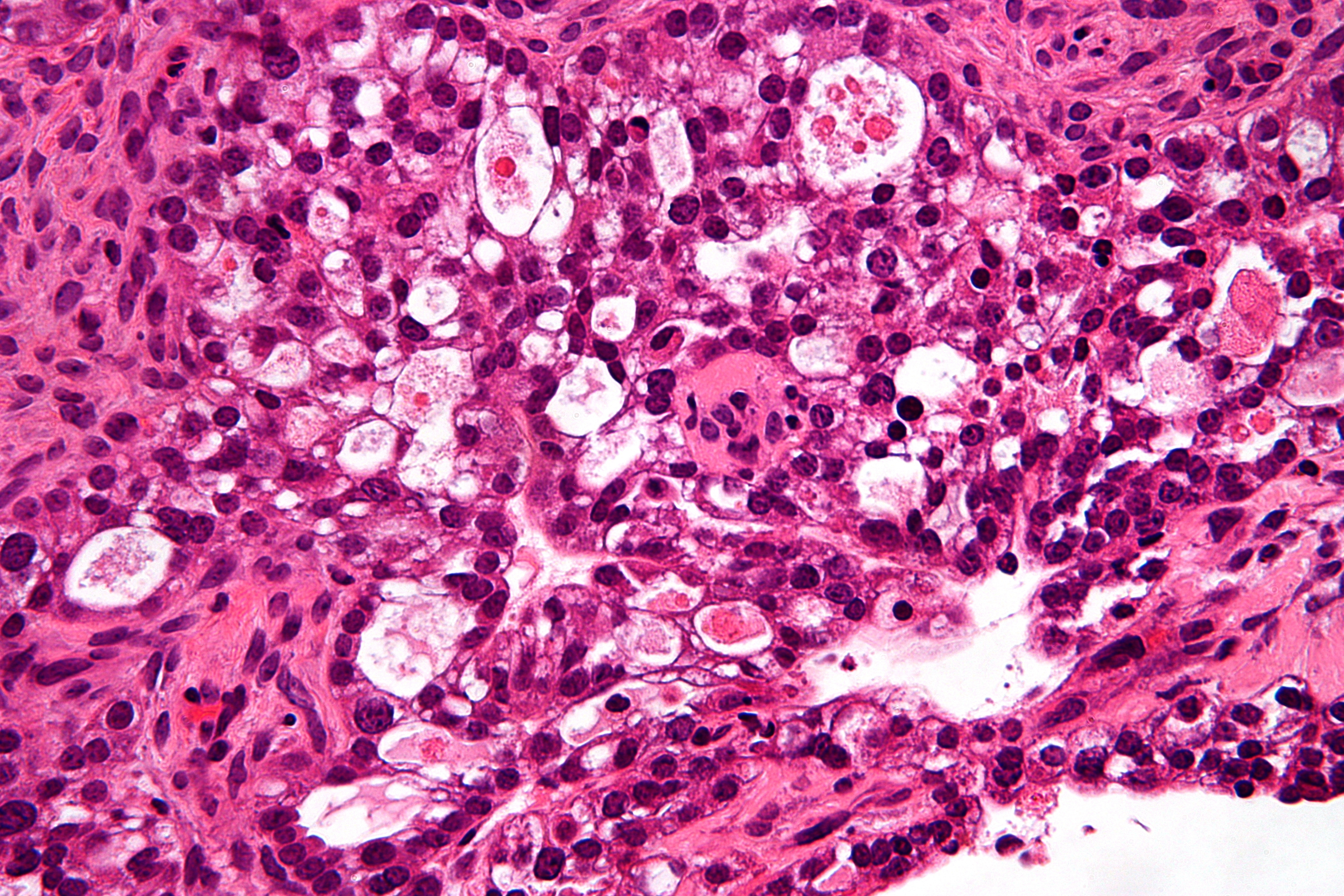
Ovarian clear-cell carcinoma

Ovarian clear-cell carcinoma is a rare subtype of epithelial ovarian cancer. Those diagnosed with ovarian clear-cell carcinoma are typically younger at the age of diagnosis and diagnosed at earlier stages than other subtypes of epithelial ovarian cancer. The highest incidence of clear-cell carcinoma of the ovary have been observed among young Asian women, especially those of Korean, Taiwanese, and Japanese background. Endometriosis has been linked to being the main risk factor for the development of clear-cell carcinoma of the ovary and is present in 50% of women diagnosed with clear-cell carcinoma of the ovary. The development of clots in the legs, such as deep vein thromboembolism, or in the lungs with pulmonary embolism, is reported to be 40% higher in patients with clear-cell carcinoma than other epithelial ovarian cancer subtypes. Mutations in molecular pathways such as ARID1A, PIK3, and PIK3CA are linked to clear-cell carcinoma. They typically present as a large, unilateral mass, with a mean size between 13 and 15 cm. 90% of cases are unilateral. Ovarian clear-cell carcinoma does not typically respond well to chemotherapy due to intrinsic chemoresistance; treatment is typically with aggressive cytoreductive surgery and platinum-based chemotherapy.

===== Clear-cell adenocarcinoma =====
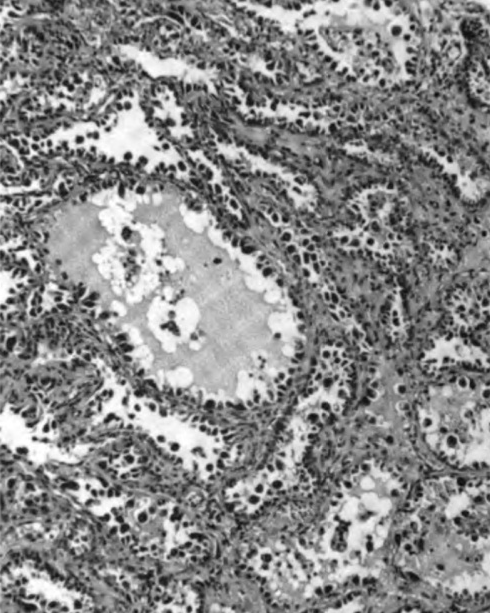
Hobnail cells seen in a clear-cell carcinoma sample

Clear-cell adenocarcinomas are histopathologically similar to other clear-cell carcinomas, with clear cells and hobnail cells. They represent approximately 5–10% of epithelial ovarian cancers and are associated with endometriosis in the pelvic cavity. They are typically early-stage and therefore curable by surgery, but advanced clear-cell adenocarcinomas (approximately 20%) have a poor prognosis and are often resistant to platinum chemotherapy.

===== Endometrioid =====
Endometrioid adenocarcinomas make up approximately 13–15% of all ovarian cancers. Because they are typically low-grade, endometrioid adenocarcinomas have a good prognosis. The median age of diagnosis is around 53 years. These tumors frequently co-occur with endometriosis or endometrial cancer. Cancer antigen 125 levels are typically elevated, and a family history of a first-degree relative with endometrioid ovarian cancer is associated with increased risk of developing endometrioid ovarian cancer. The average tumor size is larger than 10 cm.

====== Malignant mixed müllerian tumor (carcinosarcoma) ======
Mixed müllerian tumors make up less than 1% of ovarian cancer. They have epithelial and mesenchymal cells visible and tend to have a poor prognosis.

===== Mucinous =====
Mucinous tumors include mucinous adenocarcinoma and mucinous cystadenocarcinoma.

====== Mucinous adenocarcinoma ======
Mucinous adenocarcinomas make up 5–10% of epithelial ovarian cancers. Histologically, they are similar to intestinal or cervical adenocarcinomas and are often actually metastases of appendiceal or colon cancers. Advanced mucinous adenocarcinomas have a poor prognosis, generally worse than serous tumors, and are often resistant to platinum chemotherapy, though they are rare.

====== Pseudomyxoma peritonei ======
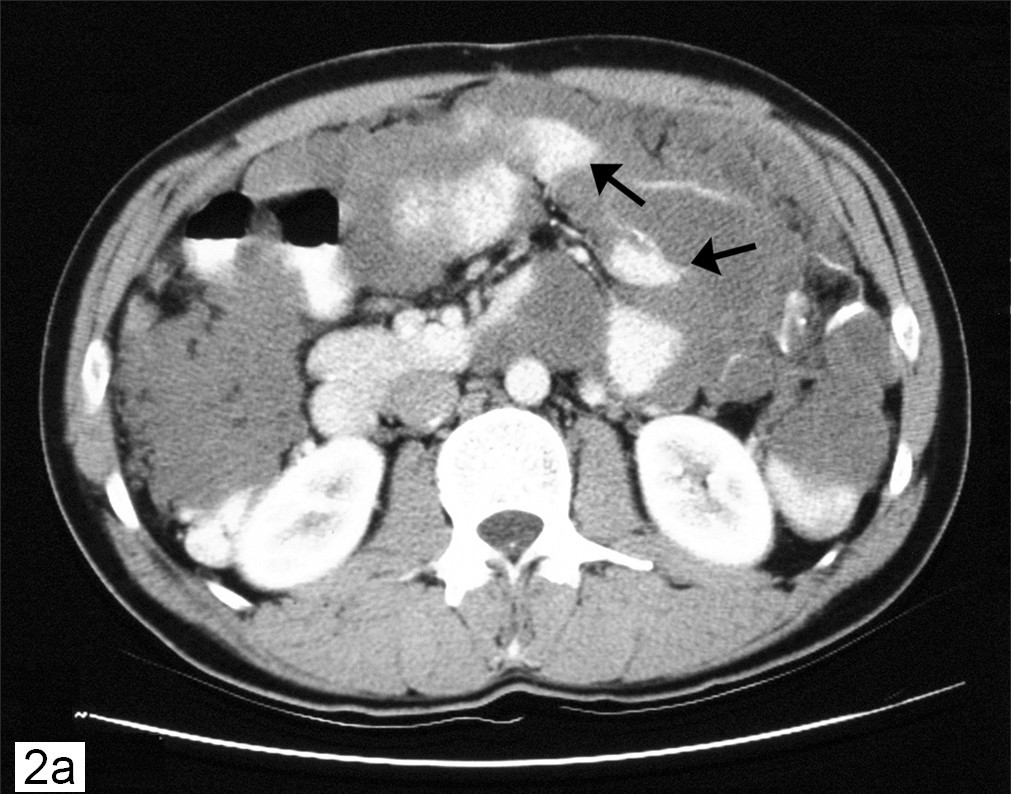
Pseudomyxoma peritonei

Pseudomyxoma peritonei refers to a collection of encapsulated mucus or gelatinous material in the abdominopelvic cavity, which is very rarely caused by a primary mucinous ovarian tumor. More commonly, it is associated with ovarian metastases of intestinal cancer.

===== Undifferentiated epithelial =====
Undifferentiated cancers - those where the cell type cannot be determined - make up about 10% of epithelial ovarian cancers and have a comparatively poor prognosis. When examined under the microscope, these tumors have very abnormal cells that are arranged in clumps or sheets. Usually, there are recognizable clumps of serous cells inside the tumor.

====== Malignant Brenner tumor ======
Brenner Tumor of ovary

Malignant Brenner tumors are rare. Histologically, they have dense fibrous stroma with areas of transitional epithelium and some squamous differentiation. To be classified as a malignant Brenner tumor, it must have Brenner tumor foci and transitional cell carcinoma. The transitional cell carcinoma component is typically poorly differentiated and resembles urinary tract cancer.

====== Transitional cell carcinoma ======
Transitional cell carcinomas represent less than 5% of ovarian cancers. Histologically, they appear similar to bladder carcinoma. The prognosis is intermediate - better than most epithelial cancers but worse than malignant Brenner tumors.

==== Sex cord-stromal tumor ====
Sex cord-stromal tumor, including estrogen-producing granulosa cell tumor, the benign thecoma, and virilizing Sertoli-Leydig cell tumor or arrhenoblastoma, accounts for 7% of ovarian cancers. They occur most frequently in women between 50 and 69 years of age, but can occur in women of any age, including young girls. They are not typically aggressive and are usually unilateral; they are therefore usually treated with surgery alone. Sex cord-stromal tumors are the main hormone-producing ovarian tumors.

Several different cells from the mesenchyme can give rise to sex-cord or stromal tumors. These include fibroblasts and endocrine cells. The symptoms of a sex-cord or stromal ovarian tumor can differ from those of other types of ovarian cancer. Common signs and symptoms include ovarian torsion, hemorrhage from or rupture of the tumor, an abdominal mass, and hormonal disruption. In children, isosexual precocious pseudopuberty may occur with granulosa cell tumors since they produce estrogen. These tumors cause abnormalities in menstruation (excessive bleeding, infrequent menstruation, or no menstruation) or postmenopausal bleeding. Because these tumors produce estrogen, they can cause or occur at the same time as endometrial cancer or breast cancer. Other sex-cord/stromal tumors present with distinct symptoms. Sertoli-Leydig cell tumors cause virilization and excessive hair growth due to the production of testosterone and androstenedione, which can also cause Cushing's syndrome in rare cases. Also, sex-cord stromal tumors occur that do not cause a hormonal imbalance, including benign fibromas, which cause ascites and hydrothorax. With germ cell tumors, sex cord-stromal tumors are the most common ovarian cancer diagnosed in women under 20.

===== Granulosa cell tumor =====
Granulosa cell tumors are the most common sex-cord stromal tumors, making up 70% of cases, and are divided into two histologic subtypes: adult granulosa cell tumors, which develop in women over 50, and juvenile granulosa tumors, which develop before puberty or before the age of 30. Both develop in the ovarian follicle from a population of cells that surrounds germinal cells.

====== Adult granulosa cell tumor ======
Adult granulosa cell tumors are characterized by a later onset (30+ years, 50 on average). These tumors produce high levels of estrogen, which causes their characteristic symptoms: menometrorrhagia; endometrial hyperplasia; tender, enlarged breasts; postmenopausal bleeding; and secondary amenorrhea. The mass of the tumor can cause other symptoms, including abdominal pain and distension, or symptoms similar to an ectopic pregnancy if the tumor bleeds and ruptures.

===== Sertoli-Leydig cell tumor =====
Sertoli-Leydig tumors are most common in women before the age of 30, and particularly common before puberty.

===== Sclerosing stromal tumors =====
Sclerosing stromal tumors typically occur in girls before puberty or women before the age of 30.

==== Germ cell tumor ====
Germ cell tumors of the ovary develop from the ovarian germ cells. Germ cell tumor accounts for about 30% of ovarian tumors, but only 5% of ovarian cancers, because most germ-cell tumors are teratomas and most teratomas are benign. Malignant teratomas tend to occur in older women, when one of the germ layers in the tumor develops into a squamous cell carcinoma. Germ-cell tumors tend to occur in young women (20s–30s) and girls, making up 70% of the ovarian cancer seen in that age group. Germ-cell tumors can include dysgerminomas, teratomas, yolk sac tumors/endodermal sinus tumors, and choriocarcinomas, when they arise in the ovary. Some germ-cell tumors have an isochromosome 12, where one arm of chromosome 12 is deleted and replaced with a duplicate of the other. Most germ-cell cancers have a better prognosis than other subtypes and are more sensitive to chemotherapy. They are more likely to be stage I at diagnosis. Overall, they metastasize more frequently than epithelial ovarian cancers. In addition, the cancer markers used vary with tumor type: choriocarcinomas are monitored with beta-HCG and endodermal sinus tumors with alpha-fetoprotein.

Germ-cell tumors are typically discovered when they become large, palpable masses. However, like sex cord tumors, they can cause ovarian torsion or hemorrhage and, in children, isosexual precocious puberty. They frequently metastasize to nearby lymph nodes, especially para-aortic and pelvic lymph nodes. The most common symptom of germ cell tumors is subacute abdominal pain caused by the tumor bleeding, necrotizing, or stretching the ovarian capsule. If the tumor ruptures, causes significant bleeding, or torses the ovary, it can cause acute abdominal pain, which occurs in less than 10% of those with germ-cell tumors. They can also secrete hormones which change the menstrual cycle. In 25% of germ-cell tumors, the cancer is discovered during a routine examination and does not cause symptoms.

Diagnosing germ cell tumors may be difficult because the normal menstrual cycle and puberty can cause pain and pelvic symptoms, and a young woman may even believe these symptoms to be those of pregnancy, and not seek treatment due to the stigma of teen pregnancy. Blood tests for alpha-fetoprotein, karyotype, human chorionic gonadotropin, and liver function are used to diagnose germ cell tumors and potential co-occurring gonadal dysgenesis. A germ cell tumor may be initially mistaken for a benign ovarian cyst.

===== Dysgerminoma =====
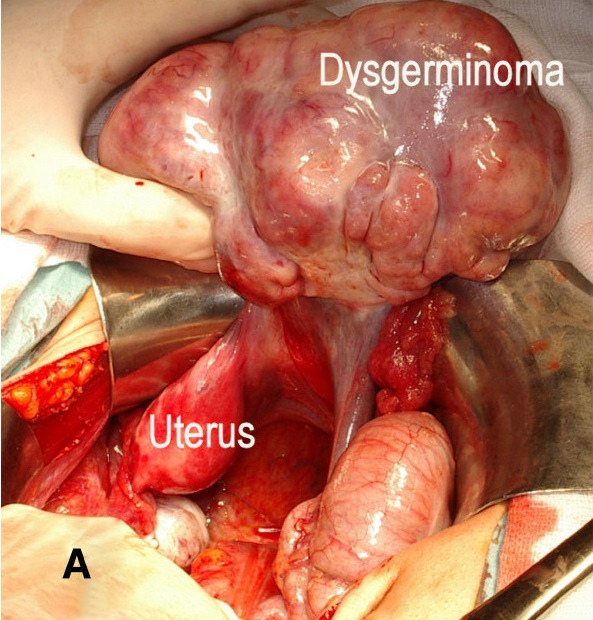
Dysgerminoma

Dysgerminoma accounts for 35% of ovarian cancer in young women and is the most likely germ cell tumor to metastasize to the lymph nodes; nodal metastases occur in 25–30% of cases. These tumors may have mutations in the KIT gene, a mutation known for its role in gastrointestinal stromal tumor. People with an XY karyotype and ovaries (gonadal dysgenesis) or an X,0 karyotype and ovaries (Turner syndrome) who develop a unilateral dysgerminoma are at risk for a gonadoblastoma in the other ovary. In this case, both ovaries are usually removed when a unilateral dysgerminoma is discovered to avoid the risk of another malignant tumor. Gonadoblastomas in people with Swyer or Turner syndrome become malignant in approximately 40% of cases. However, in general, dysgerminomas are bilateral 10–20% of the time.

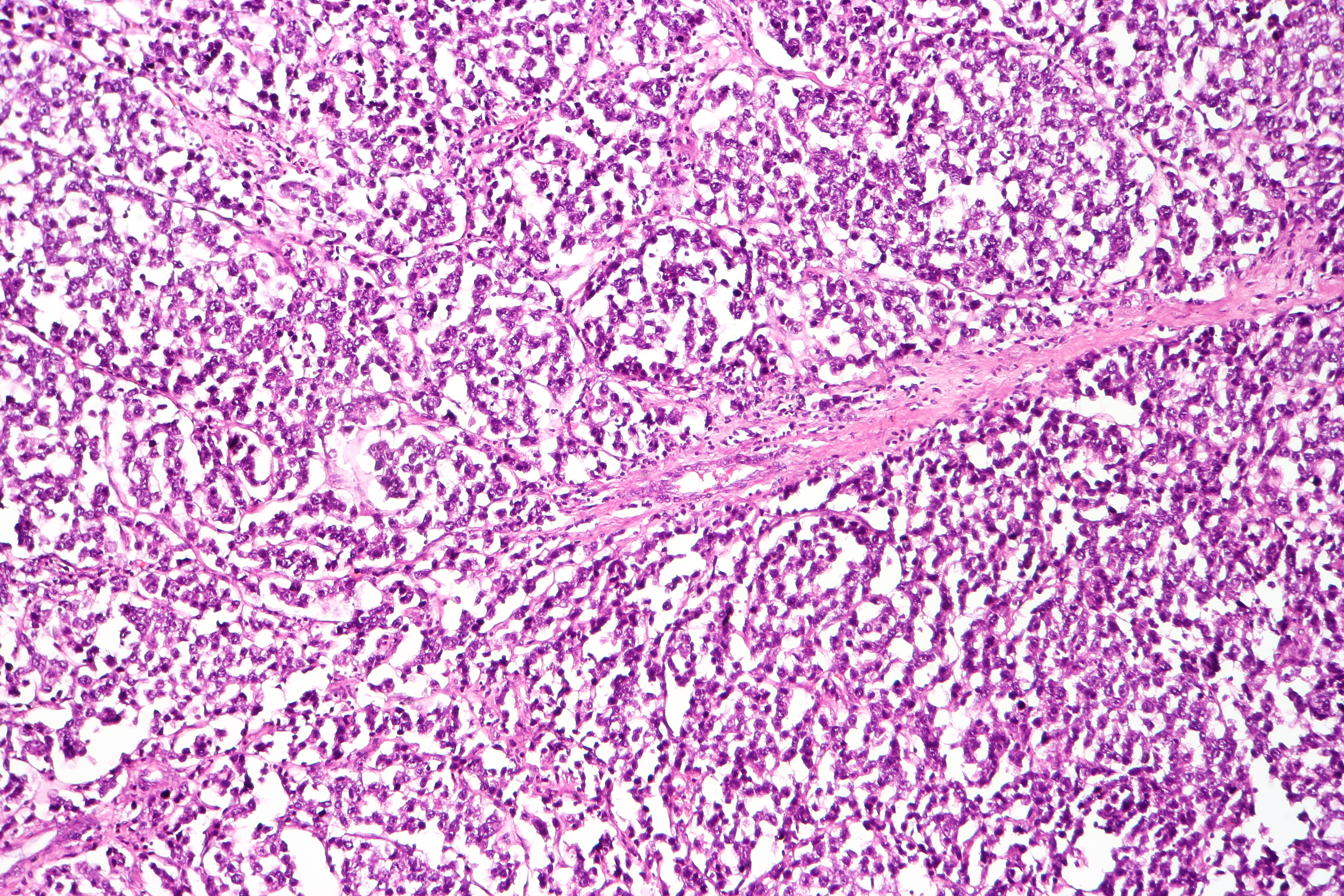
Dysgerminoma histology

They are composed of cells that cannot differentiate further and develop directly from germ cells or from gonadoblastomas. Dysgerminomas contain syncytiotrophoblasts in approximately 5% of cases, and can therefore cause elevated hCG levels. On gross appearance, dysgerminomas are typically pink to tan-colored, have multiple lobes, and are solid. Microscopically, they appear identical to seminomas and very close to embryonic primordial germ cells, having large, polyhedral, rounded clear cells. The nuclei are uniform and round or square with prominent nucleoli and the cytoplasm has high levels of glycogen. Inflammation is another prominent histologic feature of dysgerminomas.

===== Choriocarcinoma =====
Choriocarcinoma can occur as a primary ovarian tumor developing from a germ cell, though it is usually a gestational disease that metastasizes to the ovary. Primary ovarian choriocarcinoma has a poor prognosis and can occur without a pregnancy. They produce high levels of hCG and can cause early puberty in children or menometrorrhagia (irregular, heavy menstruation) after menarche.

===== Immature (solid) teratoma =====
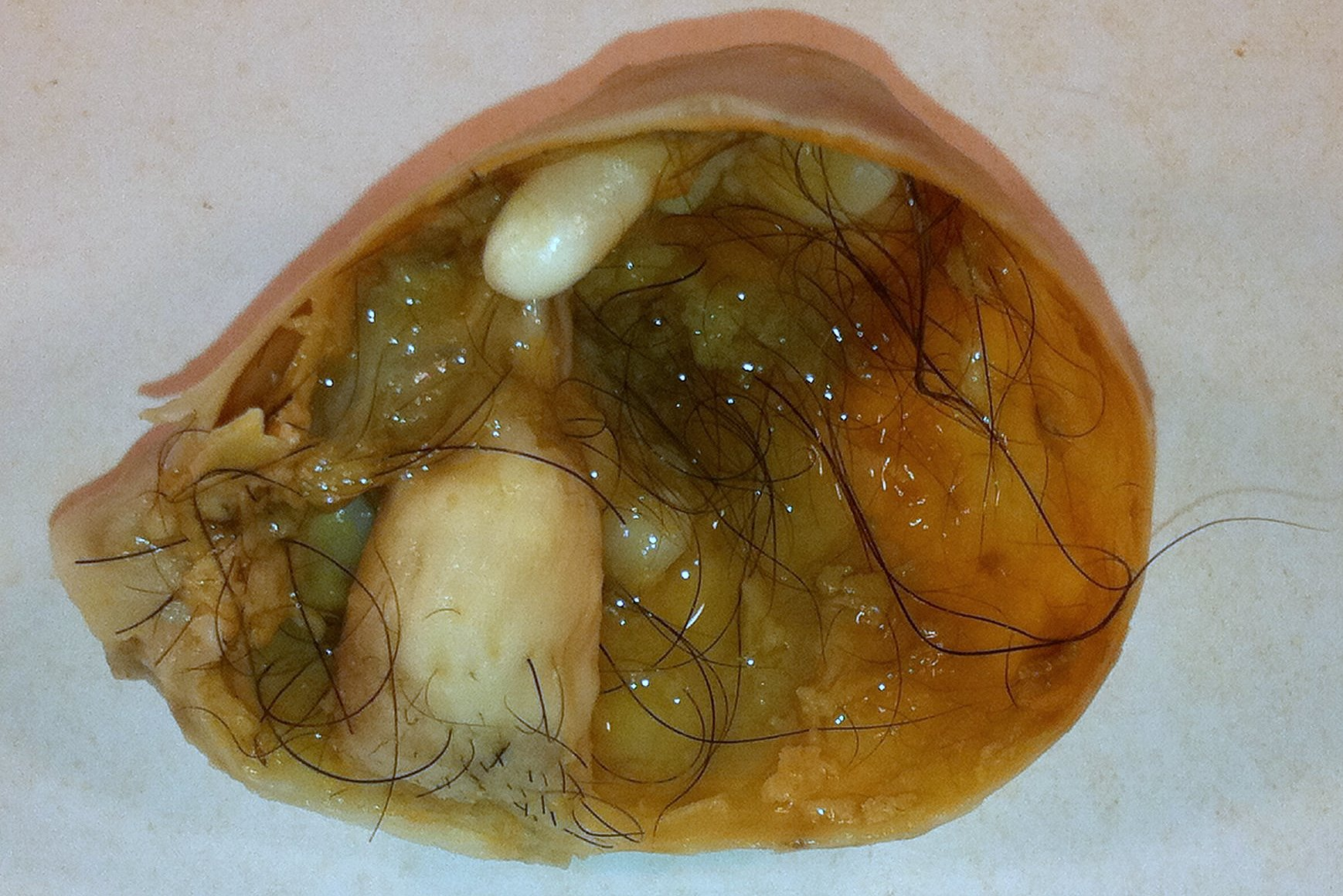
Mature Cystic Teratoma of Ovary

Immature or solid teratomas are the most common type of ovarian germ cell tumor, making up 40–50% of cases. Teratomas are characterized by the presence of disorganized tissues arising from all three embryonic germ layers: ectoderm, mesoderm, and endoderm; immature teratomas also have undifferentiated stem cells that make them more malignant than mature teratomas (dermoid cysts). The different tissues are visible on gross pathology and often include bone, cartilage, hair, mucus, or sebum. These tissues are not visible from the outside and appear to be a solid mass with lobes and cysts. Histologically, they have large amounts of neuroectoderm organized into sheets and tubules along with glia; the amount of neural tissue determines the histologic grade. Immature teratomas typically affect one ovary (10% co-occur with dermoid cysts) and usually metastasize throughout the peritoneum. They can also cause mature teratoma implants to grow throughout the abdomen in a disease called growing teratoma syndrome; these are usually benign but will continue to grow during chemotherapy, and often necessitate further surgery. Unlike mature teratomas, immature teratomas form many adhesions, making them less likely to cause ovarian torsion. There is no specific marker for immature teratomas, but carcinoembryonic antigen (CEA), CA-125, CA19-9, or AFP can sometimes indicate an immature teratoma.

Stage I teratomas make up the majority (75%) of cases and have the best prognosis, with 98% of patients surviving five years; if a Stage I tumor is also grade 1, it can be treated with unilateral surgery only. Stage II through IV tumors make up the remaining quarter of cases and have a worse prognosis, with 73–88% of patients surviving five years.

===== Mature teratoma (dermoid cyst) =====
Mature teratomas, or dermoid cysts, are rare tumors consisting mostly of benign tissue that develop after menopause. The tumors consist of disorganized tissue with nodules of malignant tissue, which can be of various types. The most common malignancy is squamous cell carcinoma, but adenocarcinoma, basal-cell carcinoma, carcinoid tumor, neuroectodermal tumor, melanoma, sarcoma, sebaceous tumor, and struma ovarii can also be part of the dermoid cyst. They are treated with surgery and adjuvant platinum chemotherapy or radiation.

===== Yolk sac tumor/endodermal sinus tumor =====
Yolk sac tumors, formerly called endodermal sinus tumors, make up approximately 10–20% of ovarian germ cell malignancies, and have the worst prognosis of all ovarian germ cell tumors. They occur both before menarche (in one-third of cases) and after menarche (the remaining two-thirds of cases). Half of the people with yolk sac tumors are diagnosed in stage I. Typically, they are unilateral until metastasis, which occurs within the peritoneal cavity and via the bloodstream to the lungs. Yolk sac tumors grow quickly and recur easily, and are not easily treatable once they have recurred. Stage I yolk sac tumors are highly treatable, with a 5-year disease-free survival rate of 93%, but stage II-IV tumors are less treatable, with survival rates of 64–91%.

Their gross appearance is solid, friable, and yellow, with necrotic and hemorrhagic areas. They also often contain cysts that can degenerate or rupture. Histologically, yolk sac tumors are characterized by the presence of Schiller-Duval bodies (which are pathognomonic for yolk sac tumors) and a reticular pattern. Yolk sac tumors commonly secrete alpha-fetoprotein and can be immunohistochemically stained for their presence; the level of alpha-fetoprotein in the blood is a useful marker of recurrence.

===== Embryonal carcinoma =====
Embryonal carcinomas, a rare tumor type usually found in mixed tumors, develop directly from germ cells but are not terminally differentiated; in rare cases, they may develop in dysgenetic gonads. They can develop further into a variety of other neoplasms, including choriocarcinoma, yolk sac tumor, and teratoma. They occur in younger people, with an average age at diagnosis of 14, and secrete both alpha-fetoprotein (in 75% of cases) and hCG.

Histologically, embryonal carcinoma appears similar to the embryonic disc, made up of epithelial, anaplastic cells in disorganized sheets, with gland-like spaces and papillary structures.

===== Polyembryoma =====
Polyembryomas, the most immature form of teratoma and very rare ovarian tumors, are histologically characterized by having several embryo-like bodies with structures resembling a germ disk, yolk sac, and amniotic sac. Syncytiotrophoblast giant cells also occur in polyembryomas.

==== Squamous cell carcinoma ====
Primary ovarian squamous cell carcinomas are rare and have a poor prognosis when advanced. More typically, ovarian squamous cell carcinomas are cervical metastases, areas of differentiation in an endometrioid tumor, or derived from a mature teratoma.

==== Mixed tumors ====
Mixed tumors contain elements of more than one of the above classes of tumor histology. To be classed as a mixed tumor, the minor type must make up more than 10% of the tumor. Though mixed carcinomas can have any combination of cell types, mixed ovarian cancers are typically serous/endometrioid or clear-cell/endometrioid. Mixed germ cell tumors make up approximately 25–30% of all germ cell ovarian cancers, with combinations of dysgerminoma, yolk sac tumor, and/or immature teratoma. The prognosis and treatment vary based on the component cell types.

==== Secondary ovarian cancer ====
Ovarian cancer can also be a secondary cancer, the result of metastasis from a primary cancer elsewhere in the body. About 5–30% of ovarian cancers are due to metastases, while the rest are primary cancers. Common primary cancers are breast cancer, colon cancer, appendiceal cancer, and stomach cancer (primary gastric cancers that metastasize to the ovary are called Krukenberg tumors). Krukenberg tumors have signet ring cells and mucinous cells. Endometrial cancer and lymphomas can also metastasize to the ovary.

==== Borderline tumors ====
Ovarian borderline tumors, sometimes called low malignant potential (LMP) ovarian tumors, have some benign and some malignant features. LMP tumors make up approximately 10–15% of all ovarian tumors. They develop earlier than epithelial ovarian cancer, around the age of 40–49. They typically do not have extensive invasion; 10% of LMP tumors have areas of stromal microinvasion (<3mm, <5% of tumor). LMP tumors have other abnormal features, including increased mitosis, changes in cell size or nucleus size, abnormal nuclei, cell stratification, and small projections on cells (papillary projections). Serous and/or mucinous characteristics can be seen on histological examination, and serous histology comprises the overwhelming majority of advanced LMP tumors. More than 80% of LMP tumors are Stage I; 15% are Stage II and III, and less than 5% are Stage IV. Implants of LMP tumors are often non-invasive.

=== Staging ===
Ovarian cancer is staged using the FIGO staging system. This system uses information obtained after surgery, which can include a total abdominal hysterectomy via midline laparotomy, removal of (usually) both ovaries and Fallopian tubes, (usually) the omentum, pelvic (peritoneal) washings, assessment of retroperitoneal lymph nodes (including the pelvic and para-aortic lymph nodes), appendectomy in suspected mucinous tumors, and pelvic/peritoneal biopsies for cytopathology. Around 30% of ovarian cancers that appear confined to the ovary have metastasized microscopically, which is why even stage-I cancers must be staged completely. 22% of cancers presumed to be stage I are observed to have lymphatic metastases. The AJCC stage is the same as the FIGO stage. The AJCC staging system describes the extent of the primary tumor (T), the absence or presence of metastasis (spread) to nearby lymph nodes (N), and the absence or presence of distant metastasis (M). The most common stage at diagnosis is stage IIIc, with over 70% of diagnoses.

==== FIGO ====
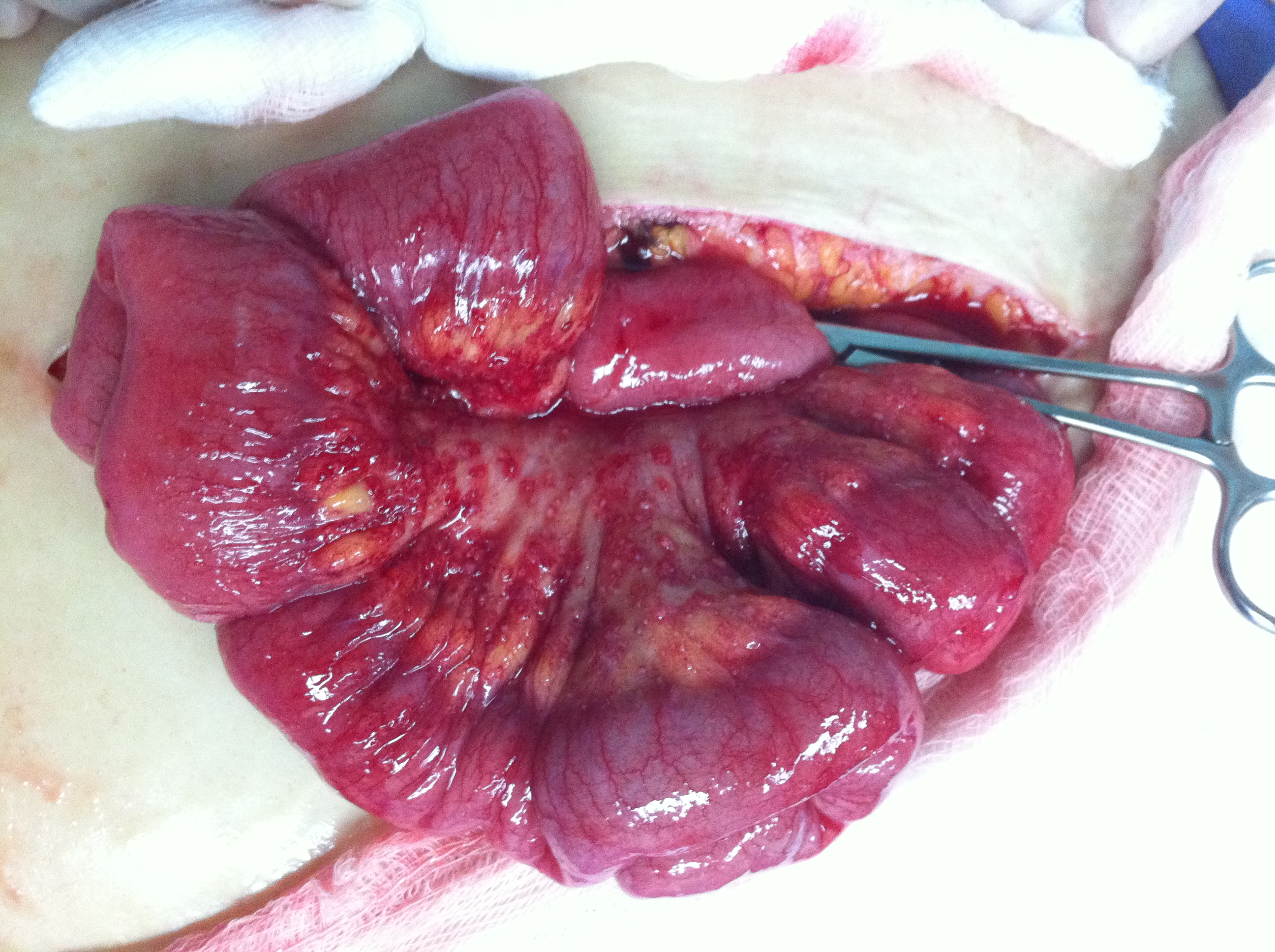
Ovarian adenocarcinoma deposit in the mesentery of the small bowel

FIGO stages of ovarian cancer
Stage				Description
I				Cancer is completely limited to the ovary
	IA			involves one ovary, capsule intact, no tumor on ovarian surface, negative washings
	IB			involves both ovaries; capsule intact; no tumor on ovarian surface; negative washings
	IC			tumor involves one or both ovaries
	IC1			surgical spill
	IC2			capsule has ruptured or a tumor on the ovarian surface
	IC3			positive ascites or washings
II				pelvic extension of the tumor (must be confined to the pelvis) or primary peritoneal tumor, involves one or both ovaries
	IIA			tumor found on the uterus or oviducts (Fallopian tubes)
	IIB			tumor elsewhere in the pelvis
III				cancer found outside the pelvis or in the retroperitoneal lymph nodes, involves one or both ovaries
	IIIA			metastasis in retroperitoneal lymph nodes or microscopic extrapelvic metastasis
		IIIA1		metastasis in the retroperitoneal lymph nodes
			IIIA1(i)	the metastasis is less than 10 mm in diameter
			IIIA1(ii)	the metastasis is greater than 10 mm in diameter
		IIIA2		microscopic metastasis in the peritoneum, regardless of retroperitoneal lymph node status
	IIIB			metastasis in the peritoneum less than or equal to 2 cm in diameter, regardless of retroperitoneal lymph node status; or metastasis to the liver or spleen capsule
	IIIC			metastasis in the peritoneum greater than 2 cm in diameter, regardless of retroperitoneal lymph node status; or metastasis to the liver or spleen capsule
IV				distant metastasis (i.e., outside of the peritoneum)
	IVA			pleural effusion containing cancer cells
	IVB			metastasis to distant organs (including the parenchyma of the spleen or liver), or metastasis to the inguinal and extra-abdominal lymph nodes

Stage 1 ovarian cancer

Stage 2 ovarian cancer

Stage 3 ovarian cancer

Stage 4 ovarian cancer

==== AJCC/TNM ====
The AJCC/TNM staging system indicates where the tumor has developed, spread to lymph nodes, and metastasized.

AJCC/TNM stages of ovarian cancer
Stage			Description
T			Primary tumor
	Tx		Cannot be assessed
	T0		No evidence
	T1		Tumor limited to ovary/ovaries
		T1a	One ovary with intact capsule, no surface tumor, and negative ascites/peritoneal washings
		T1b	Both ovaries with intact capsules, no surface tumor, and negative ascites/peritoneal washings
		T1c	One or both ovaries with ruptured capsule or capsules, surface tumor, positive ascites/peritoneal washings
	T2		Tumor is in the ovaries and pelvis (extension or implantation)
		T2a	Expansion to uterus or Fallopian tubes, negative ascites/peritoneal washings
		T2b	Expansion in other pelvic tissues, negative ascites/peritoneal washings
		T2c	Expansion to any pelvic tissue, positive ascites/peritoneal washings
	T3		Tumor is in the ovaries and has metastasized outside the pelvis to the peritoneum (including the liver capsule)
		T3a	Microscopic metastasis
		T3b	Macroscopic metastasis less than 2 cm diameter
		T3c	Macroscopic metastasis greater than 2 cm diameter
N			Regional lymph node metastasis
	Nx		Cannot be assessed
	N0		No metastasis
	N1		Metastasis present
M			Distant metastasis
	M0		No metastasis
	M1		Metastasis present (excluding liver capsule, including liver parenchyma and cytologically confirmed pleural effusion)

The AJCC/TNM stages can be correlated with the FIGO stages:

FIGO	T	N	M
I	T1	N0	M0
IA	T1a	N0	M0
IB	T1b	N0	M0
IC	T1c	N0	M0
II	T2	N0	M0
IIA	T2a	N0	M0
IIB	T2b	N0	M0
IIC	T2c	N0	M0
III	T3	N0	M0
IIIA	T3a	N0	M0
IIIB	T3b	N0	M0
IIIC	T3c	N0/N1	M0
IV	Any	Any	M1

==== Grading ====
Grade 1 tumors have well-differentiated cells (look very similar to normal tissue) and are the ones with the best prognosis. Grade 2 tumors are also known as moderately well-differentiated, and they are composed of cells that resemble normal tissue. Grade 3 tumors have the worst prognosis, and their cells are abnormal, referred to as poorly differentiated.

Metastasis in ovarian cancer is very common in the abdomen and occurs via exfoliation, where cancer cells burst through the ovarian capsule and can move freely throughout the peritoneal cavity. Ovarian cancer metastases usually grow on the surface of organs rather than the inside; they are also common on the omentum and the peritoneal lining. Cancer cells can also travel through the lymphatic system and metastasize to lymph nodes connected to the ovaries via blood vessels; i.e. the lymph nodes along the infundibulopelvic ligament, the broad ligament, and the round ligament. The most commonly affected groups include the paraaortic, hypogastric, external iliac, obturator, and inguinal lymph nodes. Usually, ovarian cancer does not metastasize to the liver, lung, brain, or kidneys unless it is a recurrent disease; this differentiates ovarian cancer from many other forms of cancer.

== Prevention ==
Women with high genetic risk for ovarian cancer may consider the surgical removal of their ovaries as a preventive measure. This is often done after completion of childbearing years. This reduces the chances of developing both breast cancer (by around 50%) and ovarian cancer (by about 96%) in women at high risk. Women with BRCA gene mutations usually also have their Fallopian tubes removed at the same time (salpingo-oophorectomy), since they also have an increased risk of Fallopian tube cancer. However, these statistics may overestimate the risk reduction because of how they have been studied.

Because a large fraction of ovarian cancers originate in the fallopian tubes, the Ovarian Cancer Research Alliance and the Society of Gynecologic Oncology now recommend that women who are not planning on having additional children and who are undergoing surgical procedures such as tubal ligation (having one's "tubes tied") undergo opportunistic salpingectomy — i.e. simultaneously having their fallopian tubes removed. OVCARE — BC Cancer's multi-institutional and multidisciplinary ovarian research group — began recommending salpingectomy at the time of hysterectomy and in place of tubal ligation in 2010.

Women with a significant family history of ovarian cancer are often referred to a genetic counselor to see if testing for BRCA mutations would be beneficial. The use of oral contraceptives, the absence of 'periods' during the menstrual cycle, and tubal ligation reduce the risk. There may be an association between developing ovarian cancer and ovarian stimulation during infertility treatments. Endometriosis has been linked to ovarian cancers. Human papillomavirus infection, smoking, and talc have not been identified as increasing the risk for developing ovarian cancer.

== Screening ==
There is no simple and reliable way to test for ovarian cancer in women who do not have any signs or symptoms. Screening is not recommended in women who are at average risk, as evidence does not support a reduction in death, and the high rate of false positive tests may lead to unneeded surgery, which is accompanied by its own risks. Women with high risk of ovarian cancer that are currently identified based on family history and genetic testing may benefit from screening. The Pap test does not screen for ovarian cancer.

Ovarian cancer is usually only palpable in advanced stages. This high-risk group has benefited from earlier detection. Screening is not recommended using CA-125 measurements, HE4 levels, ultrasound, or adnexal palpation in women who are at average risk. Currently, there is no national screening programme in the UK for ovarian cancer. CA125 and transvaginal ultrasound can be utilised, but there is minimal evidence to suggest this decreases mortality. More recently, the Risk of Ovarian Cancer Algorithm (ROMA) has been shown to detect earlier cancers using CA125 and age, but again does not provide a robust measure to decrease mortality at present.

Ovarian cancer has low prevalence, even in the high-risk group of women from ages 50 to 60 (about one in 2000), and screening of women with average risk is more likely to give ambiguous results than detect a problem that requires treatment. Because ambiguous results are more likely than detection of a treatable problem, and because the usual response to ambiguous results is invasive interventions, in women of average risk, the potential harms of having screening without an indication outweigh the potential benefits. The purpose of screening is to diagnose ovarian cancer at an early stage when it is more likely to be treated successfully.

Screening with transvaginal ultrasound, pelvic examination, and CA-125 levels can be used instead of preventive surgery in women who have BRCA1 or BRCA2 mutations. This strategy has shown some success.

Screening for CA125, a chemical released by ovarian tumours, with follow-up using ultrasound, was shown to be ineffective in reducing mortality in a large-scale UK study.

There have been some screening trials that have used age, family history of ovarian cancer, and mutation status to identify target populations for screening.

== Management ==
Once it is determined that ovarian, fallopian tube or primary peritoneal cancer is present, treatment is scheduled by a gynecologic oncologist (a physician trained to treat cancers of a woman's reproductive system). Gynecologic oncologists can perform surgery on and give chemotherapy to women with ovarian cancer. A treatment plan is developed.

Treatment usually involves surgery and chemotherapy, and sometimes radiotherapy, regardless of the subtype of ovarian cancer. Surgical treatment may be sufficient for well-differentiated malignant tumors confined to the ovary. The addition of chemotherapy may be required for more aggressive tumors confined to the ovary. For patients with advanced disease, a combination of surgical reduction with a combination chemotherapy regimen is standard. Since 1980, platinum-based drugs have had an important role in treating ovarian cancer. Borderline tumors, even following spread outside of the ovary, are managed well with surgery, and chemotherapy is not seen as useful. Second-look surgery and maintenance chemotherapy have not been shown to provide benefit.

=== Surgery ===
Surgery has been the standard of care for decades and may be necessary for obtaining a specimen for diagnosis. The surgery depends on the extent of nearby tissue invasion by the cancer when it is diagnosed. The extent of the cancer is described by assigning it a stage, the presumed type, and the grade of cancer. The gynecological surgeon may remove one (unilateral oophorectomy) or both ovaries (bilateral oophorectomy). The Fallopian tubes (salpingectomy), uterus (hysterectomy), and the omentum (omentectomy) may also be removed. Typically, all of these organs are removed.

For those who test positive for faulty BRCA1 or BRCA2 genes, having a risk-reducing surgery is an option. An increasing number of women choose this. At the same time, the average waiting time for undergoing the procedure is two years, which is much longer than recommended.

For low-grade, unilateral stage-IA cancers, only the involved ovary (which must be unruptured) and the Fallopian tube will be removed. This can be done, especially in young people who wish to preserve their fertility. However, a risk of microscopic metastases exists, and staging must be completed. If any metastases are found, a second surgery to remove the remaining ovary and uterus is needed. Tranexamic acid can be administered before surgery to reduce the need for blood transfusions due to blood loss during the surgery.

If a tumor in a premenopausal woman is determined to be a low malignant potential tumor during surgery, and it is clearly stage I cancer, only the affected ovary is removed. For postmenopausal women with low malignant potential tumors, hysterectomy with bilateral salpingo-oophorectomy is still the preferred option. During staging, the appendix can be examined or removed. This is particularly important with mucinous tumors. In children or adolescents with ovarian cancer, surgeons typically attempt to preserve one ovary to allow for the completion of puberty. If the cancer has spread, this is not always possible. Dysgerminomas, in particular, tend to affect both ovaries: 8–15% of dysgerminomas are present in both ovaries. People with low-grade (well-differentiated) tumors are typically treated only with surgery, which is often curative. In general, germ cell tumors can be treated with unilateral surgery unless the cancer is widespread or fertility is not a factor. In women with surgically staged advanced epithelial ovarian cancer (stages III and IV), studies suggest all attempts should be made to reach complete cytoreduction (surgical efforts to remove the bulk of the tumor).

In advanced cancers, where complete removal is not an option, as much tumor as possible is removed in a procedure called debulking surgery. This surgery is not always successful, and is less likely to be successful in women with extensive metastases in the peritoneum, stage- IV disease, cancer in the transverse fissure of the liver, mesentery, or diaphragm, and large areas of ascites. Debulking surgery is typically done once. A recent study has shown a longer overall survival in recurrent ovarian cancer when surgery combined with chemotherapy was performed compared to treatment with chemotherapy alone. Computed tomography (abdominal CT) is often used to assess if primary debulking surgery is possible, but low certainty evidence also suggests fluorodeoxyglucose‐18 (FDG) PET/CT and MRI may be useful as an addition for assessing macroscopic incomplete debulking. More complete debulking is associated with better outcomes: women with no macroscopic evidence of disease after debulking have a median survival of 39 months, as opposed to 17 months with less complete surgery. By removing metastases, many cells that are resistant to chemotherapy are removed, and any clumps of cells that have died are also removed. This allows chemotherapy to reach the remaining cancer cells more effectively, which are more likely to be fast-growing and therefore chemosensitive.

Interval debulking surgery is another protocol used, where neoadjuvant chemotherapy is given, debulking surgery is performed, and chemotherapy is finished after debulking. Though no definitive studies have been completed, it is shown to be approximately equivalent to primary debulking surgery in terms of survival and shows slightly lower morbidity. Previous studies have shown different results from primary debulking versus interval debulking. The ongoing TRUST study may clarify selection criteria for each surgical approach.

Several different surgical procedures can be employed to treat ovarian cancer. For stage I and II cancer, laparoscopic (keyhole) surgery can be used, but metastases may not be found. For advanced cancer, laparoscopy is not used, since debulking metastases requires access to the entire peritoneal cavity. Depending on the extent of the cancer, procedures may include a bilateral salpingo-oophorectomy, biopsies throughout the peritoneum and abdominal lymphatic system, omentectomy, splenectomy, bowel resection, diaphragm stripping or resection, appendectomy, or even a posterior pelvic exenteration.

To fully stage ovarian cancer, lymphadenectomy can be included in the surgery, However, it has not offered benefits in terms of survival in either HGSOC or LGSOC. This is particularly important in germ cell tumors because they frequently metastasize to nearby lymph nodes.

If ovarian cancer recurs, secondary surgery is sometimes a treatment option. This depends on how easily the tumor can be removed, how much fluid has accumulated in the abdomen, and overall health. The effectiveness of this surgery depends on surgical technique, completeness of cytoreduction, and extent of disease. It also can be helpful in people who had their first surgery done by a generalist and in epithelial ovarian cancer. Secondary surgery can be effective in dysgerminomas and immature teratomas. Evidence suggests surgery in recurrent epithelial ovarian cancer may be associated with prolonging life in some women with platinum-sensitive disease.

The major side effect of oophorectomy in younger women is early menopause, which can cause osteoporosis. After surgery, hormone replacement therapy can be considered, especially in younger women. This therapy can consist of a combination of estrogen and progesterone, or estrogen alone. Estrogen alone is safe after hysterectomy; when the uterus is still present, unopposed estrogen dramatically raises the risk of endometrial cancer. Estrogen therapy after surgery does not change survival rates. People having ovarian cancer surgery are typically hospitalized afterwards for 3–4 days and spend around a month recovering at home. Surgery outcomes are best at hospitals that do a large number of ovarian cancer surgeries.

It is unclear if laparoscopy or laparotomy is better or worse for FIGO stage I ovarian cancer. There is also no apparent difference between total abdominal hysterectomy and supracervical hysterectomy for advanced cancers. Approximately 2.8% of people having a first surgery for advanced ovarian cancer die within two weeks of the surgery (2.8% perioperative mortality rate). More aggressive surgeries are associated with better outcomes in advanced (stage III or IV) ovarian cancer.

=== Chemotherapy ===
Chemotherapy has been a general standard of care for ovarian cancer for decades, although with variable protocols. Chemotherapy is used after surgery to treat any residual disease, if appropriate. In some cases, there may be a reason to perform chemotherapy first, followed by surgery. This is called "neoadjuvant chemotherapy," and is common when a tumor cannot be completely removed or optimally debulked via surgery. Though it has not been shown to increase survival, it can reduce the risk of complications after surgery. If a unilateral salpingo-oophorectomy or other surgery is performed, additional chemotherapy, called "adjuvant chemotherapy", can be given. Adjuvant chemotherapy is used in stage 1 cancer, typically if the tumor is of a high histologic grade (grade 3) or the highest substage (stage 1c), provided the cancer has been optimally staged during surgery. Bevacizumab may be used as an adjuvant chemotherapy if the tumor is not completely removed during surgery or if the cancer is stage IV; it can extend progression-free survival but has not been shown to extend overall survival. Chemotherapy is curative in approximately 20% of advanced ovarian cancers; it is more often curative with malignant germ cell tumors than epithelial tumors. Adjuvant chemotherapy has been found to improve survival and reduce the risk of ovarian cancer recurring compared to no adjuvant therapy in women with early-stage epithelial ovarian cancer.

Chemotherapy in ovarian cancer typically consists of platins, a group of platinum-based drugs, combined with non-platins. Platinum-based drugs have been used since 1980. Common therapies can include paclitaxel, cisplatin, topotecan, doxorubicin, epirubicin, and gemcitabine. Carboplatin is typically given in combination with either paclitaxel or docetaxel; the typical combination is carboplatin with paclitaxel. Carboplatin is superior to cisplatin in that it is less toxic and has fewer side effects, generally allowing for an improved quality of life in comparison, though both are similarly effective. Three-drug regimens are not more effective, and platinum-based therapies alone or nonplatinum-based therapies alone are less effective than platinum-based therapies and nonplatinum-based therapies in combination. There is a small benefit in platinum‐based chemotherapy compared with non‐platinum therapy. Platinum combinations can offer improved survival over single platinum. In people with relapsed ovarian cancer, evidence suggests topotecan has a similar effect on overall survival as paclitaxel and topotecan plus thalidomide, whilst it is superior to treosulfan and not as effective as pegylated liposomal doxorubicin in platinum-sensitive people.

Chemotherapy can be given intravenously or in the peritoneal cavity. Though intraperitoneal chemotherapy is associated with longer progression-free survival and overall survival, it also causes more adverse side effects than intravenous chemotherapy. It is mainly used when the cancer has been optimally debulked. Intraperitoneal chemotherapy can be highly effective because ovarian cancer mainly spreads inside the peritoneal cavity, and higher doses of the drugs can reach the tumors this way.

Chemotherapy can cause anemia; intravenous iron is more effective than oral iron supplements in reducing the need for blood transfusions. Transferrin levels reflect disruptions in iron metabolism that occur early in the disease. Typical cycles of treatment involve one treatment every 3 weeks, repeated for 6 weeks or more. Fewer than 6 weeks (cycles) of treatment is less effective than 6 weeks or more. Germ-cell malignancies are treated differently than other ovarian cancers — a regimen of bleomycin, etoposide, and cisplatin (BEP) is used with 5 days of chemotherapy administered every 3 weeks for 3 to 4 cycles. Chemotherapy for germ cell tumors has not been shown to cause amenorrhea, infertility, birth defects, or miscarriage. Maintenance chemotherapy has not been shown to be effective.

In people with BRCA mutations, platinum chemotherapy is more effective. Germ-cell tumors and malignant sex-cord/stromal tumors are treated with chemotherapy, though dysgerminomas and sex-cord tumors are not typically very responsive.

==== Platinum-sensitive or platinum-resistant ====
If ovarian cancer recurs, it is considered partially platinum-sensitive or platinum-resistant, based on the time since the last recurrence treated with platinum-based treatments: partially platinum-sensitive cancers recurred 6–12 months after the last treatment, and platinum-resistant cancers have an interval of less than 6 months. Second-line chemotherapy can be given after the cancer becomes symptomatic because no difference in survival is seen between treating asymptomatic (elevated CA-125) and symptomatic recurrences.

For platinum-sensitive tumors, platins are the drugs of choice for second-line chemotherapy, in combination with other cytotoxic agents. Regimens include carboplatin combined with pegylated liposomal doxorubicin, gemcitabine, or paclitaxel. Carboplatin-doublet therapy can be combined with paclitaxel for increased efficacy in some cases. Another potential adjuvant therapy for platinum-sensitive recurrences is olaparib, which may improve progression-free survival but has not been shown to improve overall survival. (Olaparib, a PARP inhibitor, was approved by the US FDA for use in BRCA-associated ovarian cancer that had previously been treated with chemotherapy.) For recurrent germ cell tumors, an additional 4 cycles of BEP chemotherapy is the first-line treatment for those who have been treated with surgery or platins.

Tumors that have a high expression of a protein called ALDH1A1 are found to be resistant to chemotherapy and this resistance can be overcome by blocking ALDH1A1. If the tumor is determined to be platinum-resistant, vincristine, dactinomycin, and cyclophosphamide (VAC) or some combination of paclitaxel, gemcitabine, and oxaliplatin may be used as a second-line therapy.

For platinum-resistant tumors, there are no high-efficacy chemotherapy options. Single-drug regimens (doxorubicin or topotecan) do not have high response rates, but single-drug regimens of topotecan, pegylated liposomal doxorubicin, or gemcitabine are used in some cases. Topotecan cannot be used in people with an intestinal blockage. Paclitaxel used alone is another possible regimen, or it may be combined with liposomal doxorubicin, gemcitabine, cisplatin, topotecan, etoposide, or cyclophosphamide. ( See also Palliative care below.)

Novel agents are being developed to inhibit the development of new blood vessels (angiogenesis) for women with ovarian cancer who develop resistance to chemotherapy drugs. As of 2023, there would appear to be a role for these treatments, but due to the additional treatment burden and cost of maintenance treatments, the risks versus benefits require careful consideration.

Novocure sponsored a phase-2 trial proving the efficacy of tumor treating fields in recurrent platinum-resistant ovarian carcinoma, in conjunction with weekly paclitaxel chemotherapy.

=== Radiation therapy ===
Dysgerminomas are most effectively treated with radiation, though this can cause infertility and is being phased out in favor of chemotherapy. Radiation therapy does not improve survival in people with well-differentiated tumors. Radiotherapy can also be used in the palliative care of advanced cancers.

Common side effects of radiotherapy include diarrhea, constipation, and frequent urination. Radiotherapy late effects (and occurrence rates) include osteonecrosis (8-20%), bladder ulceration (<3%), vaginal stenosis (>2.5%) and irreversible lumbosacral plexopathy.

=== Hormonal therapy ===
Despite the fact that 60% of ovarian tumors have estrogen receptors, ovarian cancer is only rarely responsive to hormonal treatments. A Cochrane review found a lack of evidence about the effects of tamoxifen in people with relapsed ovarian cancer. Estrogen alone does not have an effect on the cancer, and tamoxifen and letrozole are rarely effective. "Some women with borderline malignancy ovarian cancer and stromal ovarian cancer may receive hormonal therapy."

=== Immunotherapy ===
Immunotherapy is a topic of current research in ovarian cancer. In some cases, the antibody drug bevacizumab, though still a topic of active research, is used to treat advanced cancer along with chemotherapy. It has been approved for this use in the European Union.

=== Follow-up ===
Specific follow-up depends on, for example, the type and stage of ovarian cancer, the treatment, and the presence of any symptoms. Usually, a check-up appointment is made about every 2 to 3 months initially, followed by twice per year for up to 5 years. For epithelial ovarian cancers, the most common test upon follow-up is the CA-125 level. However, treatment based only on elevated CA-125 levels and not any symptoms can increase side effects without prolonging life, so the implications of the outcome of a CA-125 test can be discussed before taking it. The recommendation as of 2014 is that recurrent cancer may be present if the CA-125 level is twice normal. Treating a recurrence detected by CA-125 does not improve survival.

For women with germ-cell tumors, follow-up tests generally include alpha-fetoprotein (AFP) and/or human chorionic gonadotropin. For women with stromal cancers, tests for hormones like estrogen, testosterone, and inhibin are sometimes helpful. Inhibin can also be useful for monitoring the progress of sex-cord tumors, along with Müllerian inhibiting substance. AFP can also be used to monitor Sertoli-Leydig tumors. In dysgerminomas, lactate dehydrogenase and its two isozymes (LDH-1 and LDH-2) are used to test for recurrence.

Women with ovarian cancer may not need routine surveillance imaging to monitor the cancer unless new symptoms appear or tumor markers begin rising. Imaging without these indications is discouraged because it is unlikely to detect a recurrence, improve survival, and because it has its own costs and side effects. However, CT imaging can be used if desired, though this is not common. If a tumor is easily imaged, imaging may be used to monitor the progress of treatment.

=== Palliative care ===
Palliative care focuses on relieving symptoms and increasing or maintaining quality of life. This type of treatment's purpose is not to cure the cancer but to make the woman more comfortable while living with cancer that can not be cured. It has been recommended as part of the treatment plan for any person with advanced ovarian cancer or patients with significant symptoms. In platinum-refractory and platinum-resistant cases, other palliative chemotherapy is the main treatment.

Palliative care can entail treatment of symptoms and complications of the cancer, including pain, nausea, constipation, ascites, bowel obstruction, edema, pleural effusion, and mucositis. Especially if the cancer advances and becomes incurable, treatment of symptoms becomes one of the main goals of therapy. Palliative care can also entail helping with decision-making, such as when hospice care is appropriate, and the preferred place for the patient during end-of-life care.

Bowel obstruction can be treated with palliative surgery (colostomy, ileostomy, or internal bypass) or medicine, but surgery has been shown to increase survival time. Palliative surgery may result in short bowel syndrome, enterocutaneous fistula, or re-obstruction; or may not be possible due to the extent of obstruction. Other treatments of complications can include total parenteral nutrition, a low-residue diet, palliative gastrostomy, and adequate pain control. Bowel obstruction can also be treated with octreotide when palliative surgery is not an option. Cancer can also block the ureters, which can be relieved by a nephrostomy or a ureteric stent. Ascites can be relieved by repeated paracentesis or placement of a drain to increase comfort. Pleural effusions can be treated in a similar manner, with repeated thoracentesis, pleurodesis, or placement of a drain.

Radiation therapy can be used as part of the palliative care of advanced ovarian cancer, since it can help to shrink tumors that are causing symptoms. Palliative radiotherapy typically lasts for only a few treatments, a much shorter course of therapy than non-palliative radiotherapy. It is also used for palliation of chemotherapy-resistant germ cell tumors.

=== Psychosocial care ===
Ovarian cancer has a significant effect on quality of life, psychological health, and well-being. Interventions are available to help with the needs and social support. Many ovarian cancer survivors report a good quality of life and optimism. Others reported a "spiritual change" that helped them find meaning during their experience. Others have described their loss of faith after their diagnosis with ovarian cancer. Those who have gone through treatment sometimes experience social isolation but benefit from having relationships with other survivors. Frustration and guilt have been described by some who have expressed their inability to care for their family.

Self-esteem and body image changes can occur due to hair loss, removal of ovaries and other reproductive structures, and scars. There is some improvement after the hair grows in. Sexual issues can develop. The removal of ovaries results in surgically induced menopause that can result in painful intercourse, vaginal dryness, loss of sexual desire, and being tired. Though prognosis is better for younger survivors, the impact on sexuality can still be substantial.

Anxiety, depression, and distress are present in those surviving ovarian cancer at higher rates than in the general population. The same psychosocial problems can develop in family members. Emotional effects can include a fear of death, sadness, memory problems, and difficulty concentrating. When optimism was adopted by those at the beginning of their treatment, they were less likely to develop distress. Those who have a fear of the cancer recurring may have difficulty in expressing joy even when disease-free. The more treatments that a woman undergoes, the more likely the loss of hope is expressed. Women often can cope and reduce negative psychosocial effects through several strategies. Activities such as traveling, spending additional time with family and friends, ignoring statistics, journaling, and increasing involvement in spiritually-based events are adaptive.

Women with ovarian cancer may also experience difficulties with their diet and are at risk of malnutrition.

== Prognosis ==
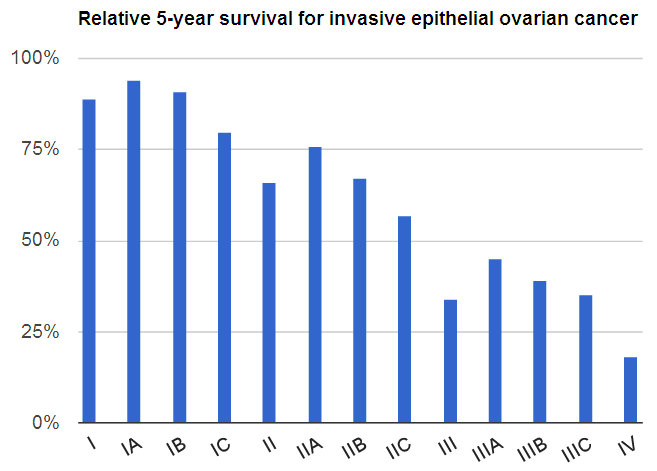
Relative five-year survival of invasive epithelial ovarian cancer by stage

Ovarian cancer usually has a relatively poor prognosis. It is disproportionately deadly because it lacks any clear early detection or screening test, meaning most cases are not diagnosed until they have reached advanced stages.

Ovarian cancer metastasizes early in its development, often before it has been diagnosed. High-grade tumors metastasize more readily than low-grade tumors. Typically, tumor cells begin to metastasize by growing in the peritoneal cavity. More than 60% of women presenting with ovarian cancer have stage-III or stage-IV cancer, when it has already spread beyond the ovaries. Ovarian cancers shed cells into the naturally occurring fluid within the abdominal cavity. These cells can then implant on other abdominal (peritoneal) structures, including the uterus, urinary bladder, bowel, lining of the bowel wall, and omentum, forming new tumor growths before cancer is even suspected.

The five-year survival rate for all stages of ovarian cancer is over 50% in the UK; the one-year survival rate is 80% and the ten-year survival rate is around 40%. For cases where a diagnosis is made early in the disease, when the cancer is still confined to the primary site, the five-year survival rate is 95%. About 70% of women with advanced disease respond to initial treatment, most of whom attain complete remission, but half of these women experience a recurrence 1–4 years after treatment. Brain metastasis is more common in stage III/IV cancer but can still occur in cancers staged at I/II. People with brain metastases survive a median of 8.2 months, though surgery, chemotherapy, and whole brain radiation therapy can improve survival.

Ovarian cancer survival varies significantly with subtype. Dysgerminomas have a very favorable prognosis. In the early stages, they have a five-year survival rate of 96.9%. Around two-thirds of dysgerminomas are diagnosed at stage I. Stage-III dysgerminomas have a five-year survival of 61%; when treated with BEP chemotherapy after incomplete surgical removal, dysgerminomas have a 95% two-year survival rate. Sex-cord-stromal malignancies also have a favorable prognosis, because they are slow-growing, and even those with metastatic disease can survive a decade or more. Low malignant potential tumors usually only have a bad prognosis when there are invasive tumor implants found in the peritoneal cavity.

Complications of ovarian cancer can include the spread of the cancer to other organs, progressive dysfunction of various organs, ascites, and intestinal obstructions, which can be fatal. Intestinal obstructions in multiple sites are the most common proximate cause of death. Intestinal obstruction in ovarian cancer can either be a true obstruction, where tumor blocks the intestinal lumen, or a pseudo-obstruction, when tumor prevents normal peristalsis. Continuous accumulation of ascites can be treated by placing a drain that can be self-drained.

=== Prognostic factors ===
There are several prognostic factors in ovarian cancer. Positive prognostic factors – those indicating better chances of survival – include no residual disease after surgery (stage III/IV), complete macroscopic resection (stage IV), BRCA2 mutations, young age (under 45 years), nonserous type, low histologic grade, early stage, co-occurrence with endometrial cancer, and low CA-125 levels. There is conflicting evidence for BRCA1 as a prognostic factor. Conversely, negative prognostic factors – those that indicate a worse chance of survival – include rupture of the ovarian capsule during surgery, older age (over 45 years), mucinous type, stage IV, high histologic grade, clear-cell type, upper abdominal involvement, high CA-125 levels, the presence of tumor cells in the blood, and elevated cyclooxygenase-2.

Expression of various mRNAs can also be prognostic for ovarian cancer. High levels of Drosha and Dicer are associated with improved survival, whereas high levels of let-7b, HIF1A, EphA1, and poly(ADP-ribose) polymerase are associated with worse survival. Cancers that are positive for WT1 carry a worse prognosis; estrogen-receptor-positive cancers have a better prognosis.

=== Survival rates ===
Overall five-year survival rates for all types of ovarian cancer are presented below by stage and histologic grade:

Stage	Survival
I	90–95%
II	70–80%
III	20–50%
IV	1–5%

Histologic grade	Survival
Low grade	88%
Intermediate grade	58%
High grade	27%

The survival rates given below are for the different types of ovarian cancer, according to American Cancer Society. They come from the National Cancer Institute, SEER, and are based on patients diagnosed from 2004 to 2010.

Invasive epithelial ovarian cancer
Stage	Relative five-year survival rate
I	90%
IA	94%
IB	92%
IC	85%
II	70%
IIA	78%
IIB	73%
III	39%
IIIA	59%
IIIB	52%
IIIC	39%
IV	17%

Ovarian stromal tumors
Stage	Relative five-year survival rate
I	95%
II	78%
III	65%
IV	35%

Germ cell tumors of the ovary
Stage	Relative five-year Survival Rate
I	98%
II	94%
III	87%
IV	69%

Fallopian tube carcinoma
Stage	Relative five-year survival rate
I	87%
II	86%
III	52%
IV	40%

Low malignant potential tumors
Stage	Relative five-year survival rate
I	99%
II	98%
III	96%
IV	77%

=== Recurrence rates ===
Ovarian cancer frequently recurs after treatment. Overall, in 5 years, 20% of stage I and II cancers recur. Most recurrences are in the abdomen. If a recurrence occurs in advanced disease, it typically occurs within 18 months of initial treatment (18 months progression-free survival). Recurrences can be treated, but the disease-free interval tends to shorten, and chemoresistance increases with each recurrence. When a dysgerminoma recurs, it is most likely to recur within a year of diagnosis, and other malignant germ cell tumors recur within 2 years 90% of the time. Germ cell tumors other than dysgerminomas have a poor prognosis when they relapse, with a 10% long-term survival rate. Low malignant potential tumors rarely relapse, even when fertility-sparing surgery is the treatment of choice. 15% of LMP tumors relapse after unilateral surgery in the previously unaffected ovary, and they are typically easily treated with surgery. More advanced tumors may take up to 20 years to relapse, if they relapse at all, and are only treated with surgery unless the tumor has changed its histological characteristics or grown very quickly. In these cases, and when there is significant ascites, chemotherapy may also be used. Rising CA-125 levels often indicate relapse, which then progresses to symptomatic relapse within 2–6 months. Recurrent sex cord-stromal tumors are typically unresponsive to treatment but not aggressive.

It is the most deadly gynecologic cancer.

== Epidemiology ==
Age-standardized death from ovarian cancer per 100,000 inhabitants in 2004 no data less than 0.6 0.6–1.2 1.2–1.8 1.8–2.4 2.4–3 3–3.6 3.6–4.2 4.2–4.8 4.8–5.4 5.4–6 6–7 more than 7

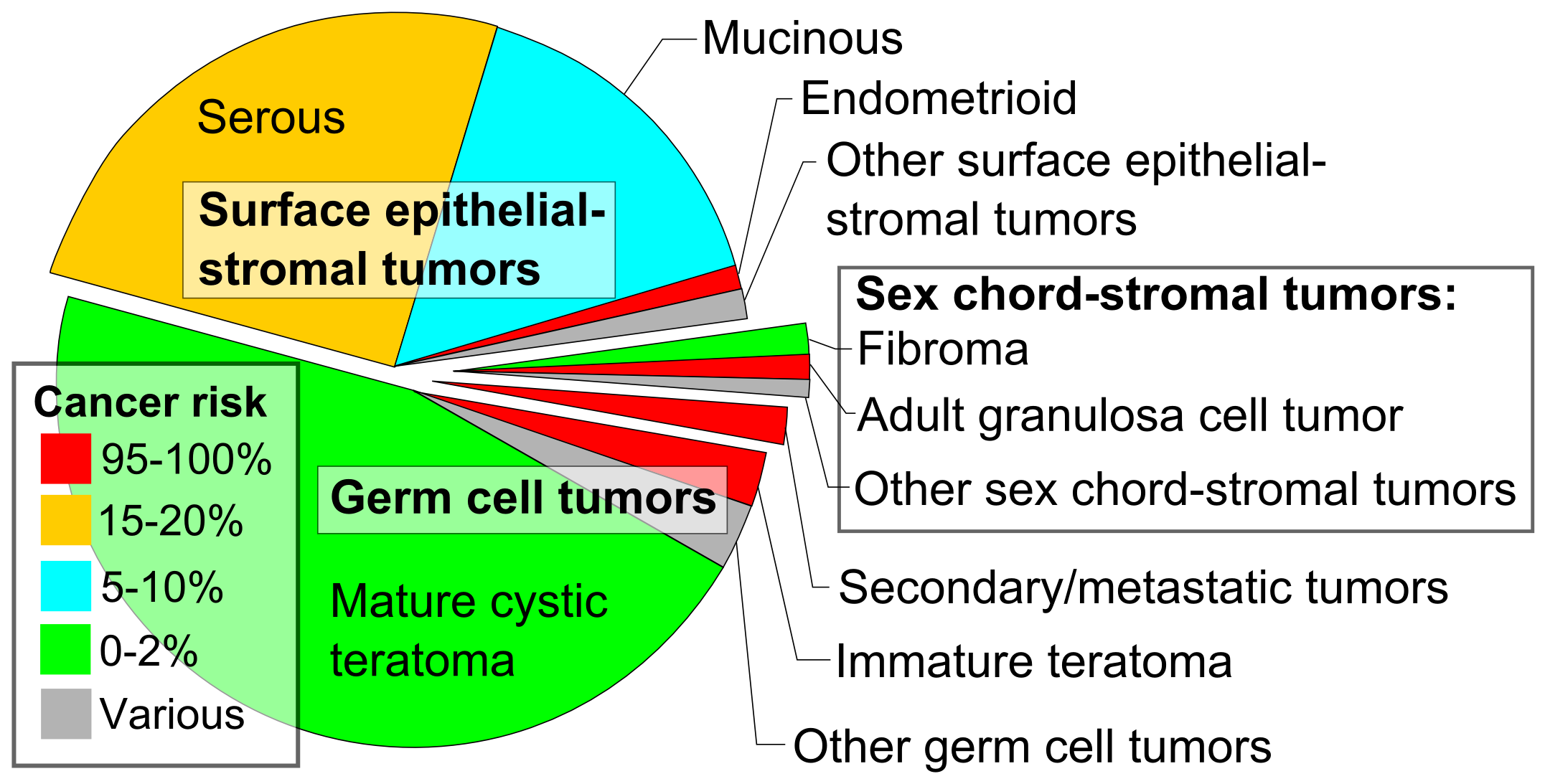
Ovarian tumors (including non-cancerous tumors) by incidence and risk of ovarian cancer.

Globally, in 2018, the incidence of ovarian cancer was 6.6 per 100,000 and mortality was 3.9. Globally, about 160,000 people died from ovarian cancer in 2010. This was an increase from 113,000 in 1990. The number of new cases per year in Europe is approximately 5–15 per 100,000 women. In Europe, Lithuania, Latvia, Ireland, Slovakia, and the Czech Republic have the highest incidences of ovarian cancer, whereas Portugal and Cyprus have the lowest incidences. In 2008, the five-year survival rate was 44%. This has increased since 1977 when the survival rate was 36%.

=== United States ===
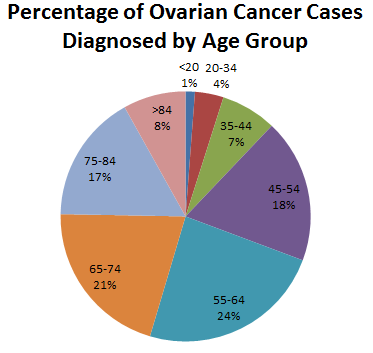
Ovarian cancer cases diagnosed by age group in the US

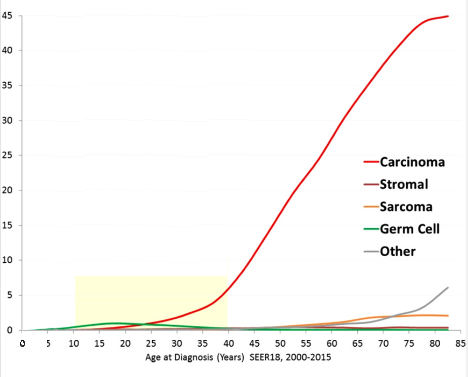
Ovarian cancer by age and type.

In 2022, in the United States, an estimated 19,880 new cases were diagnosed, and 12,810 women died of ovarian cancer. The 5-year relative survival rate is 49.7%. Around 57% of cases have metastasized at the time of diagnosis.

In 2014, over 220,000 diagnoses of epithelial ovarian cancer were made yearly. The overall lifetime risk in the US is around 1.6% In the US, ovarian cancer affects 1.3–1.4% and is the cause of death of about 1% of women. In the United States, it is also the fifth-most common cancer in women but the fourth-most common cause of cancer death. This decrease made it the ninth-most common cancer in women.

The risks of developing specific types of ovarian cancer vary. Germ cell tumors and sex cord-stromal tumors are less common than epithelial tumors. The number of new cases a year in the US is 0.4 per 100,000 women and 0.2 per 100,000 women, respectively. In young people, sex-cord stromal tumors and germ cell tumors total 1% of overall ovarian cancer. Ovarian cancer represents approximately 4% of cancers diagnosed in women.

=== United Kingdom ===
It is the 5th-most common cancer in UK women (around 7,100 were diagnosed in 2011) and the 5th-most common cause of cancer death in women (around 4,300 died in 2012). The incidence rate over the whole UK population is 21.6 per 100,000.

As of 2014, the UK saw approximately 7,000–7,100 yearly diagnoses with 4,200 deaths. A 2022 article from The Times put the estimate at 7,500 new cases yearly in Britain. Early symptoms are often mistaken for common conditions such as cystitis or irritable bowel syndrome, and about 40 per cent of UK women wrongly believe that cervical screening detects ovarian cancer, an increase from 30 per cent in 2016.

=== Ethnicity ===
Black women have twice the risk for sex cord-stromal tumors compared to non-Black women. The highest prevalence is in Caucasian and Hispanic women, followed by African-American and Asian women. The highest mortality from ovarian cancer is in African-American women. Ashkenazi Jewish women carry mutated BRCA alleles five times more often than the rest of the population, giving them a higher risk developing ovarian cancer.

=== Older women ===
In the US, the incidence rate in women over 50 is approximately 33 per 100,000. The rate of ovarian cancer between 1993 and 2008 decreased in women of the 40–49 age cohort and in the 50–64 age cohort. Ovarian cancer is most commonly diagnosed after menopause, between the ages of 60 and 64. Ninety percent of ovarian cancer occurs in women over the age of 45, and 80% in women over 50. Older women are more likely to present with advanced ovarian cancer.

== In pregnancy ==
Malignant germ cell tumors are the type of ovarian cancer most likely to occur during pregnancy. They are typically diagnosed when an adnexal mass is found on examination (in 1–2% of all pregnancies), a tumor is seen on ultrasound, or the parents' level of alpha-fetoprotein is elevated. Dermoid cysts and dysgerminomas are the most common germ cell tumors during pregnancy. Germ cell tumors diagnosed during pregnancy are unlikely to have metastasized and can be treated by surgery and, in some cases, chemotherapy, which carries the risk of birth defects. Yolk sac tumors and immature teratomas grow particularly quickly and are usually treated with chemotherapy even during pregnancy; however, dysgerminomas that have been optimally debulked may be treated after childbirth.

== Other animals ==
Ovarian tumors have been reported in equine mares. Reported tumor types include teratoma, cystadenocarcinoma, and particularly granulosa cell tumor.

== Research ==
=== Screening ===
Screening by hysteroscopy to obtain cell samples obtained for histological examination is being developed. This is similar to the current Pap smear, which is used to detect cervical cancer. The UK Collaborative Trial of Ovarian Cancer Screening is testing a screening technique that combines CA-125 blood tests with transvaginal ultrasound. Other studies suggest that this screening procedure may be effective. Although results published in 2015 were not conclusive, there was some evidence that screening may save lives in the long-term. As a result, the trial has been extended and will publish definitive results at the end of 2019. One major problem with screening is no clear progression of the disease from stage I (noninvasive) to stage III (invasive) is seen, and it may not be possible to find cancers before they reach stage III. Another problem is that screening methods tend to find too many suspicious lesions, most of which are not cancer, but malignancy can only be assessed with surgery. The ROCA method combined with transvaginal ultrasonography is being researched in high-risk women to determine if it is a viable screening method. It is also being investigated in normal-risk women as it has shown promise in the wider population. Studies are also in progress to determine if screening helps detect cancer earlier in people with BRCA mutations.

Researchers from BGI Genomics and Fudan University have uncovered significant findings on ovarian cancer (OV) in Chinese patients, revealing a unique RAD51D variant that may serve as a therapeutic target. Published in JCO Global Oncology, the study identified an enriched RAD51D variant associated with tumor growth promotion. Notably, the RAD51D K91fs variant was found to increase sensitivity to PARP inhibitors, such as olaparib and niraparib, offering new treatment avenues.

=== Prognosis research ===
Research into various prognostic factors for ovarian cancer is also going on. Recent research shows that thrombocytosis predicts lower survival and higher stage cancer. Ongoing research is also investigating the benefits of surgery for recurrent ovarian cancer.

=== Immunotherapy ===
While an active area of research, as of 2018, there is no good evidence that immunotherapy is effective for ovarian cancer. However, trials of the antibody and VEGF inhibitor bevacizumab, which can slow the growth of new blood vessels in the cancer, have shown promising results, especially in combination with pazopanib, which also slows the process of blood vessel growth. Bevacizumab has been particularly effective in preliminary studies on stage-III and -IV cancer and has been cited as having at least a 15% response rate. It is being investigated particularly in mucinous ovarian cancers.

=== Pharmacology ===
mTOR inhibitors were a highly investigated potential treatment in the 2000s and 2010s, but the side effects of these drugs (particularly hyperglycemia and hyperlipidemia) were not well tolerated, and the survival benefit was not confirmed. PI3 kinase inhibitors have been of interest, but they tend to be highly toxic and cause diarrhea. Another investigated drug is selumetinib, a MAPK inhibitor. It improved survival, but did not correlate with any mutations found in tumors.

Bevacizumab can also be combined with platinum chemotherapy, a combination that has had positive preliminary results in PFS, but equivocal results regarding overall survival. One disadvantage to these treatments is the side effect profile, which includes high blood pressure and proteinuria. The drug can also exacerbate bowel disease, leading to fistulae or bowel perforation. Vintafolide, which consists of an antifolate conjugated with vinblastine, is also in clinical trials; it may prove beneficial because folate receptors are overexpressed in many ovarian cancers. Another potential immunotherapy is trastuzumab, which is active against tumors positive for Her2/neu mutations. Other angiogenesis inhibitors are also being investigated as potential ovarian cancer treatments. Combretastatin and pazopanib are being researched in combination for recurrent ovarian cancer. Trebananib and tasquinimod are other angiogenesis inhibitors being investigated. The monoclonal antibody farletuzumab is being researched as an adjuvant to traditional chemotherapy. Another type of immunotherapy involves vaccines, including TroVax.

An alternative to BEP chemotherapy, a regimen of 3 cycles of carboplatin and etoposide, is a current topic of research for germ cell malignancies.

Intraperitoneal chemotherapy has also been under investigation during the 2000s and 2010s for its potential to deliver higher doses of cytotoxic agents to tumors. Preliminary trials with cisplatin and paclitaxel have shown that it is not well tolerated, but does improve survival, and more tolerable regimens are being researched. Cisplatin and paclitaxel are both being researched as intraperitoneal chemotherapy agents. A specific chemotherapy regimen for rare clear-cell cancers is also under investigation: irinotecan combined with cisplatin.

PARP inhibitors have also shown promise in early trials, particularly in people with BRCA gene mutations, since the BRCA protein interacts with the PARP pathway. It is also being studied in recurrent ovarian cancer in general, where preliminary studies have shown longer PFS. Specifically, olaparib has shown greater survival compared to doxorubicin, though this treatment is still being investigated. It is not clear yet which biomarkers are predictive of responsiveness to PARP inhibitors. Rucaparib is another PARP inhibitor being researched in BRCA-positive and BRCA-negative recurrent advanced ovarian cancer. Niraparib is a PARP inhibitor being tested in BRCA-positive recurrent ovarian cancer.

Tyrosine kinase inhibitors are another investigational drug class that may have applications in ovarian cancer. Angiogenesis inhibitors in the receptor tyrosine kinase inhibitor group, including pazopanib, cediranib, and nintedanib, have also been shown to increase progression-free survival (PFS), but their benefit for overall survival has not been investigated as of 2015. Preliminary research showed that cediranib combined with platinum-based therapies in recurrent ovarian cancer increased the time to second recurrence by 3–4 months and increased survival by 3 months. MK-1775 is a tyrosine kinase inhibitor that is being used in combination with paclitaxel and carboplatin in platinum-sensitive cancers with p53 mutations. Nintedanib is being researched as a potential therapy in combination with cyclophosphamide for people with recurrences.

Histone deacetylase inhibitors (HDACi) are another area of research.

=== Hormones and radiation ===
Hormone therapies are a topic of current research in ovarian cancer, particularly the value of certain medications used to treat breast cancer. These include tamoxifen, letrozole, and anastrozole. Preliminary studies have shown a benefit from tamoxifen in a small number of people with advanced ovarian cancer. Letrozole may help to slow or stop the growth of estrogen receptor positive ovarian cancer. Anastrozole is being investigated in postmenopausal people with estrogen receptor-positive cancer.

Research into mitigating the side effects of ovarian cancer treatment is also ongoing. Radiation fibrosis, the formation of scar tissue in an area treated with radiation, may be relieved with hyperbaric oxygen therapy. Research has not been completed in this area. Treatment of ovarian cancer may also cause people to experience psychiatric difficulties, including depression. Research is ongoing to determine how counseling and psychotherapy can help people who have ovarian cancer during treatment.

=== Inflammation ===
There are some indications that pelvic inflammatory disease may be associated with ovarian cancer, especially in non-Western countries. It may be due to the inflammatory process present with pelvic inflammatory disease.

=== Clinical trials ===
Clinical trials are monitored and funded by US governmental organizations to test treatment options to see if they are safe and effective. These include NIH Clinical Research Trials and You (National Institutes of Health), Learn About Clinical Trials (National Cancer Institute), Search for Clinical Trials (National Cancer Institute), ClinicalTrials.gov (National Institutes of Health). Clinical trials are also conducted in Canada.

== See also ==
- Chemotherapy
- Male and female infertility
- Female reproductive system
