= Clear-cell carcinoma =

Rare form of cancer

Clear-cell carcinoma, also known as clear-cell adenocarcinoma and mesonephroma, is an epithelial-cell-derived carcinoma characterized by the presence of clear cells observed during histological, diagnostic assessment. This form of cancer is classified as a rare cancer with an incidence of 4.8% in white patients, 3.1% in black patients, and 11.1% in Asian patients.

Clear-cell carcinoma may arise in multiple tissue types including the kidney (clear-cell renal-cell carcinoma), ovary (ovarian clear-cell carcinoma), uterus (uterine clear-cell carcinoma) or gastrointestinal tract (colorectal clear-cell carcinoma). The clear-cell variant is also a histomorphological pattern of pancreatic ductal adenocarcinoma (PDAC). This is where the cytoplasm is almost completely translucent in the exocrine cells of the pancreas and very exaggerated nuclei are visible. This clear cell pattern can be mistaken for a benign tumor, leading to challenges with accurate and timely diagnoses.

Treatment options for clear cell carcinoma vary by the tissue type affected. It may include a combination of chemotherapy (paclitaxel and carboplatin or irinotecan plus cisplatin) and surgical resection in ovarian clear-cell carcinoma; debulking or resection paired with chemotherapy (cisplatin) in ovarian clear-cell carcinoma; cytokine therapy (IL-2, interferon), kinase inhibitors (temsirolimus, sunitinib, sorafenib, pazopanib) and anti-angiogenic therapies (bevacizumab).
