= Uterine clear-cell carcinoma =

- Specialty: Gynecology, oncology

Uterine clear-cell carcinoma (CC) is a rare form of endometrial cancer with distinct morphological features on pathology; it is aggressive and has high recurrence rate. Like uterine papillary serous carcinoma CC does not develop from endometrial hyperplasia and is not hormone sensitive, rather it arises from an atrophic endometrium. Such lesions belong to the type II endometrial cancers.

== Diagnosis ==
The lesion is found in patients who present typically with abnormal or postmenopausal bleeding or discharge. Such bleeding is followed by further evaluation leading to a tissue diagnosis, usually done by a dilatation and curettage (D&C). A work-up to follow would look for metastasis using imaging technology including sonography and MRI. The median age at diagnosis in a large study was 66 years. Histologically the lesion may coexist with classical endometrial cancer.

== Treatment ==
Prognosis of the CC is affected by age, stage, and histology as well as treatment

The primary treatment is surgical. FIGO-cancer staging is done at the time of surgery which consists of peritoneal cytology, total hysterectomy, bilateral salpingo-oophorectomy, pelvic/para-aortic lymphadenectomy, and omentectomy. The tumor is aggressive and spreads quickly into the myometrium and the lymphatic system. Thus even in presumed early stages, lymphadenectomy and omentectomy should be included in the surgical approach. If the tumor has spread surgery is cytoreductive followed by radiation therapy and/or chemotherapy.

The five years survival was reported to be 68%.

=== Staging ===
Uterine clear-cell carcinoma is staged like other forms of endometrial carcinoma at time of surgery using the International Federation of Gynecology and Obstetrics (FIGO) cancer staging system 2009.

IA	Tumor confined to the uterus, no or < 1/2 myometrial invasion
IB	Tumor confined to the uterus, > 1/2 myometrial invasion
II	Cervical stromal invasion, but not beyond uterus
IIIA	Tumor invades serosa or adnexa
IIIB	Vaginal and/or parametrial involvement
IIIC1	Pelvic node involvement
IIIC2	Para-aortic involvement
IVA	Tumor invasion bladder and/or bowel mucosa
IVB	Distant metastases including abdominal metastases and/or inguinal lymph nodes
