= Uterine serous carcinoma =

Type of cancer of the uterus

Uterine papillary serous carcinoma
- Other names: Uterine papillary serous carcinoma and Uterine serous adenocarcinoma
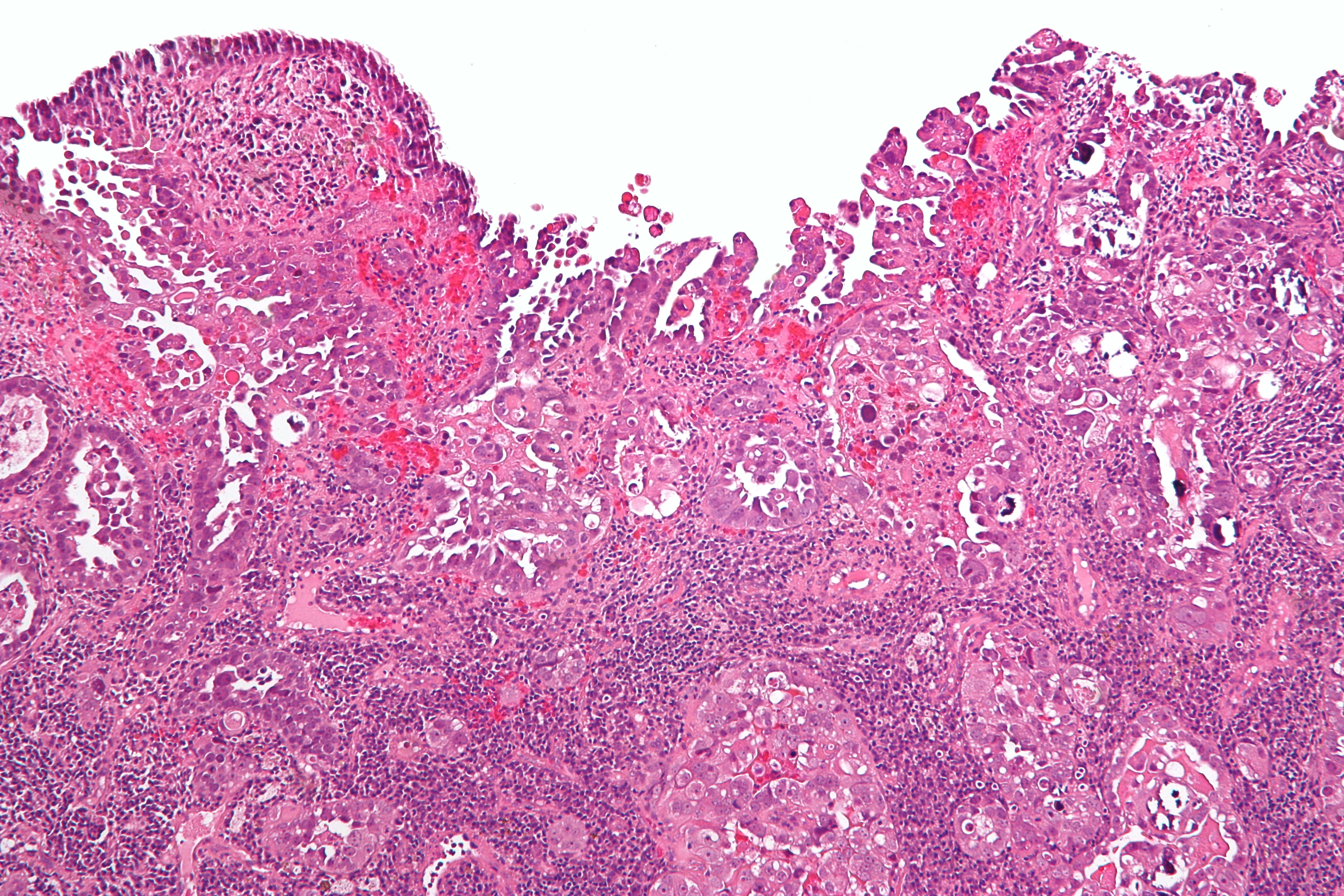
- Histology H&E of uterine serous papillary carcinoma. H&E stain.

Uterine serous carcinoma, previously called uterine papillary serous carcinoma, is a malignant form of serous tumor that originates in the uterus. It is an uncommon form of endometrial cancer that typically arises in postmenopausal women. It is typically diagnosed on endometrial biopsy, prompted by post-menopausal bleeding.

Despite the name, it is a cancer of the endometrium, which is the inner layer of the uterus; and not of the serous membrane that forms the outer layer of the uterus. The name arises from its histological similarity to serous ovarian cancer.

Unlike the more common low-grade endometrioid endometrial adenocarcinoma, uterine serous carcinoma does not develop from endometrial hyperplasia and is not hormone-sensitive. It arises in the setting of endometrial atrophy and is classified as a type II endometrial cancer.

== Cause ==
Initially there is a precursor lesion called serous endometrial intraepithelial carcinoma. Mutation is found in TP53 gene which is a tumor suppressor gene even in precursor lesion suggesting early involvement of this gene. Also many missense mutation and mutation in PI3K and PP2A genes are involved which also contribute to this tumor.

== Diagnosis ==
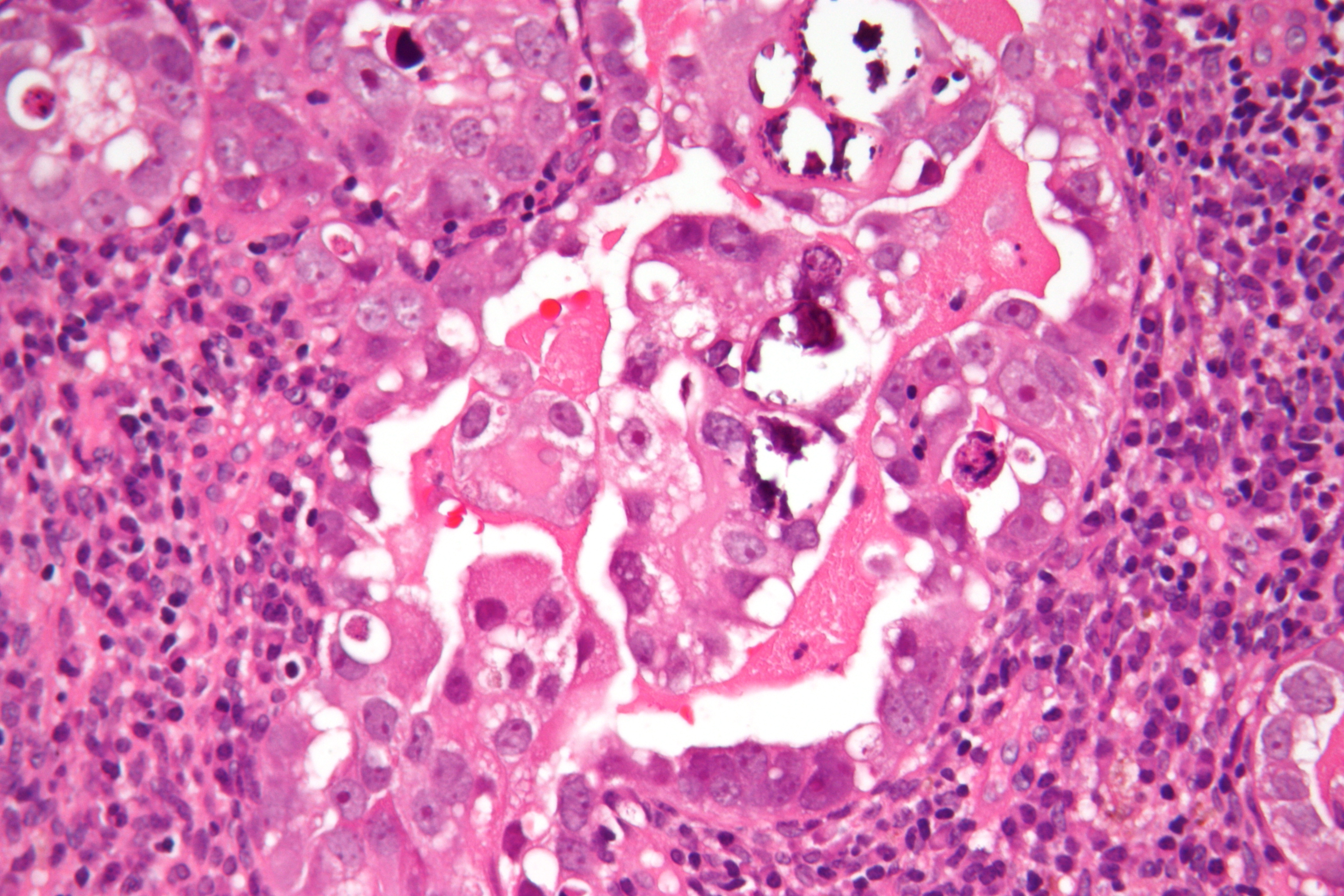
Micrograph of uterine serous carcinoma demonstrating characteristic psammoma bodies and cilia. H&E stain.

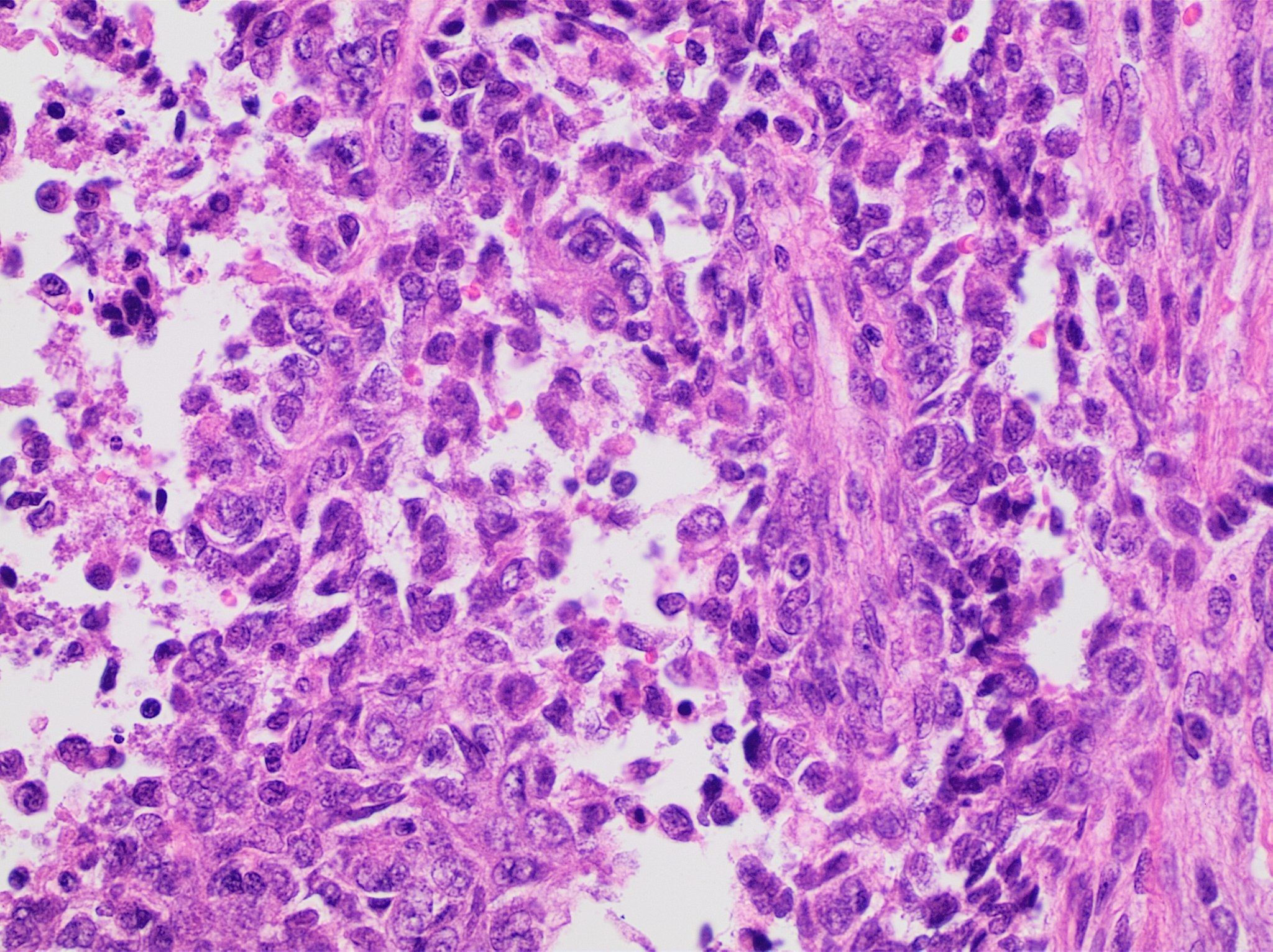
Characteristic discohesiveness of cells (like falling apart) around fibrovascular cores

The lesion is found in patients who present typically with abnormal or postmenopausal bleeding. Such bleeding is followed by further evaluation leading to a tissue diagnosis, usually done by a dilatation and curettage. A work-up to follow would look for metastasis using imaging technology including sonography and magnetic resonance imaging. The median age at diagnosis in a study of 138 women was 67 years, of these 54 had stage I, 20 stage II, 41 stage III, and 23 stage IV disease.

=== Histopathology ===
Histopathologically, uterine serous carcinomas is typically characterized by (1) nipple-shaped structures (papillae) with fibrovascular cores (2) marked nuclear atypia (irregularities in the nuclear membrane, enlarged nuclear size), (3) psammoma bodies and (4) cilia. These are general findings in serous tumors which are also seen in such tumors in other anatomic locations.

=== Staging ===
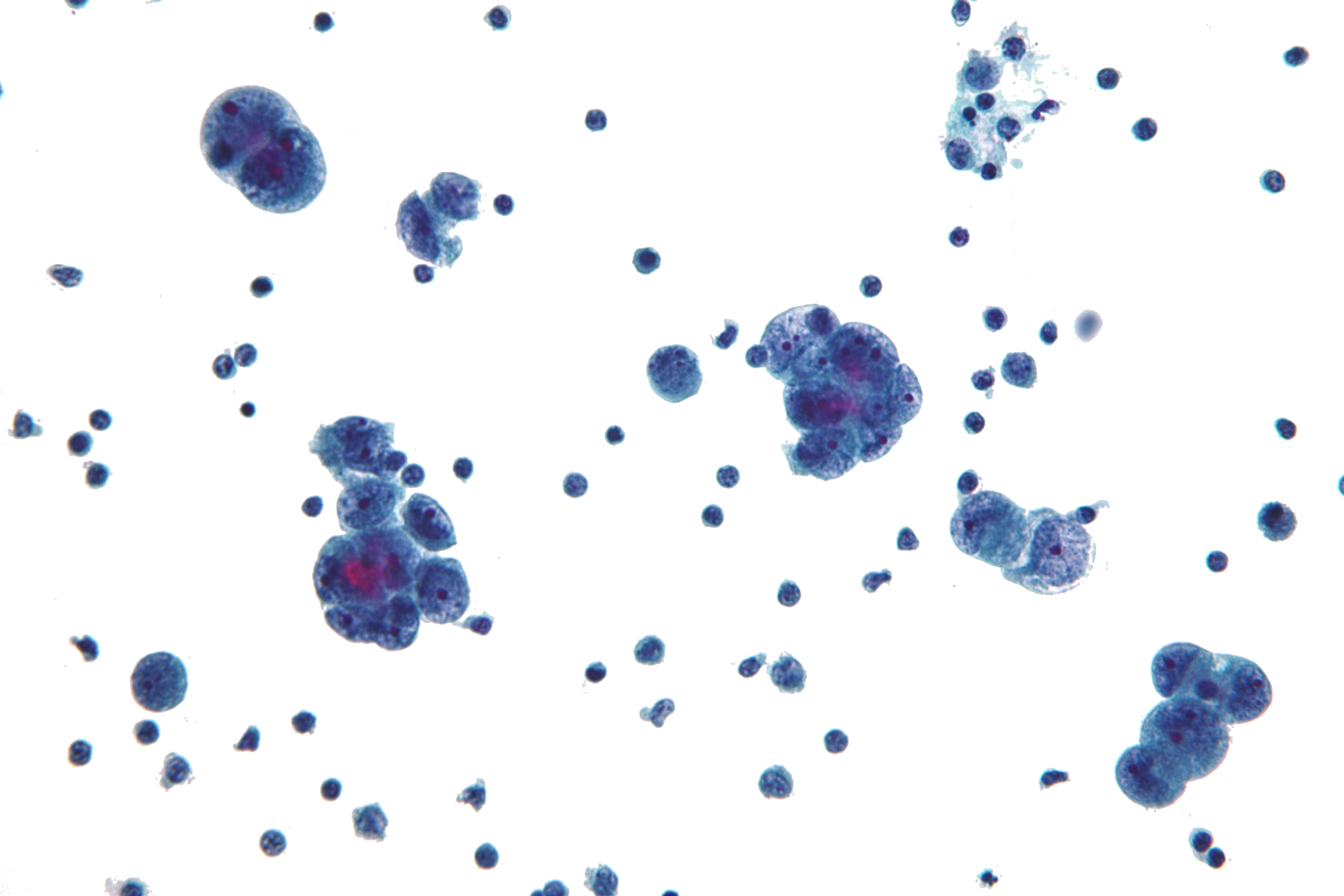
Micrograph showing (malignant) peritoneal cytopathology (serous carcinoma), indicating at least Stage IIIA disease

Uterine papillary serous carcinoma is staged like other forms of endometrial carcinoma at time of surgery using the International Federation of Gynecology and Obstetrics cancer staging system.

- Stage IA: tumor is limited to less than half the myometrium
- Stage IB: invasion of more than half the myometrium
- Stage II: cervical stromal invasion
- Stage IIIA: tumor invades serosa or adnexa
- Stage IIIB: vaginal or parametrial metastasis
- Stage IIIC1: metastasis to pelvic lymph nodes
- Stage IIIC2: metastasis to para-aortic lymph nodes
- Stage IVA: invasion of the bladder or bowel
- Stage IVB: distant metastasis, including intra-abdominal or inguinal lymph nodes

=== Survival ===
In the older literature survival rates have been given as 35–50% for stage I–II and 0–15% for stage III and IV uterine papillary serous carcinoma, More recently it was reported that forty-two percent of 138 patients were found disease-free at five years.

In 2009, the journal of "Gynecologic Oncology" reported the following 5-year survival rates based upon stage of cancer:

- Stage I: 50–80%
- Stage II: 50%
- Stage III: 20%
- Stage IV: 5% - 10%

== Treatment ==
The primary treatment is surgical. FIGO-cancer staging is done at the time of surgery which consists of peritoneal cytology, total hysterectomy, bilateral salpingo-oophorectomy, pelvic/para-aortic lymphadenectomy, and omentectomy. The tumor is aggressive and spreads quickly into the myometrium and the lymphatic system. Thus even in presumed early stages, lymphadenectomy and omentectomy should be included in the surgical approach. If the tumor has spread surgery is cytoreductive followed by radiation therapy and/or chemotherapy.

In a study to determine if adjuvant therapy should be used in patients with stage I uterine papillary serous carcinoma who had undergone surgery, no increased survival was seen when radiation therapy was added versus observation, while the postsurgical treatment with chemotherapy may be beneficial but more data are needed. A study of the usefulness of platinum-based chemotherapy as an adjuvant after surgery of stage I patients showed that patients with stage 1A who had no residual disease in the hysterectomy specimen had no recurrence regardless if chemotherapy was used or not, however, patients with stage 1A disease with residual disease in the hysterectomy specimen had no recurrence with platinum-based therapy, but those who had no such chemotherapy showed recurrence in 43%. Similarly, patients with stage 1B disease with chemotherapy had no recurrence, while those without chemotherapy had a high degree (77%) of recurrence.

=== Trastuzumab ===
In a recent study, about 60% of uterine serous carcinomas were found to overexpress the protein HER2/neu—the same one that is overexpressed in some breast cancers. The monoclonal antibody trastuzumab (Herceptin) is currently being tested as a therapy for this subset of uterine serous carcinomas.

The antibody trastuzumab (Herceptin), which is used to treat breast cancers that overexpress the HER2/neu protein, has been tried with some success in a phase II trial in women with uterine papillary serous carcinomas that overexpress HER2/neu.

== Prognosis ==
Prognosis of uterine papillary serous carcinoma is affected by age, stage, and histology as well as treatment.
