= Endometrial intraepithelial neoplasia =

Premalignant lesion in the uterus

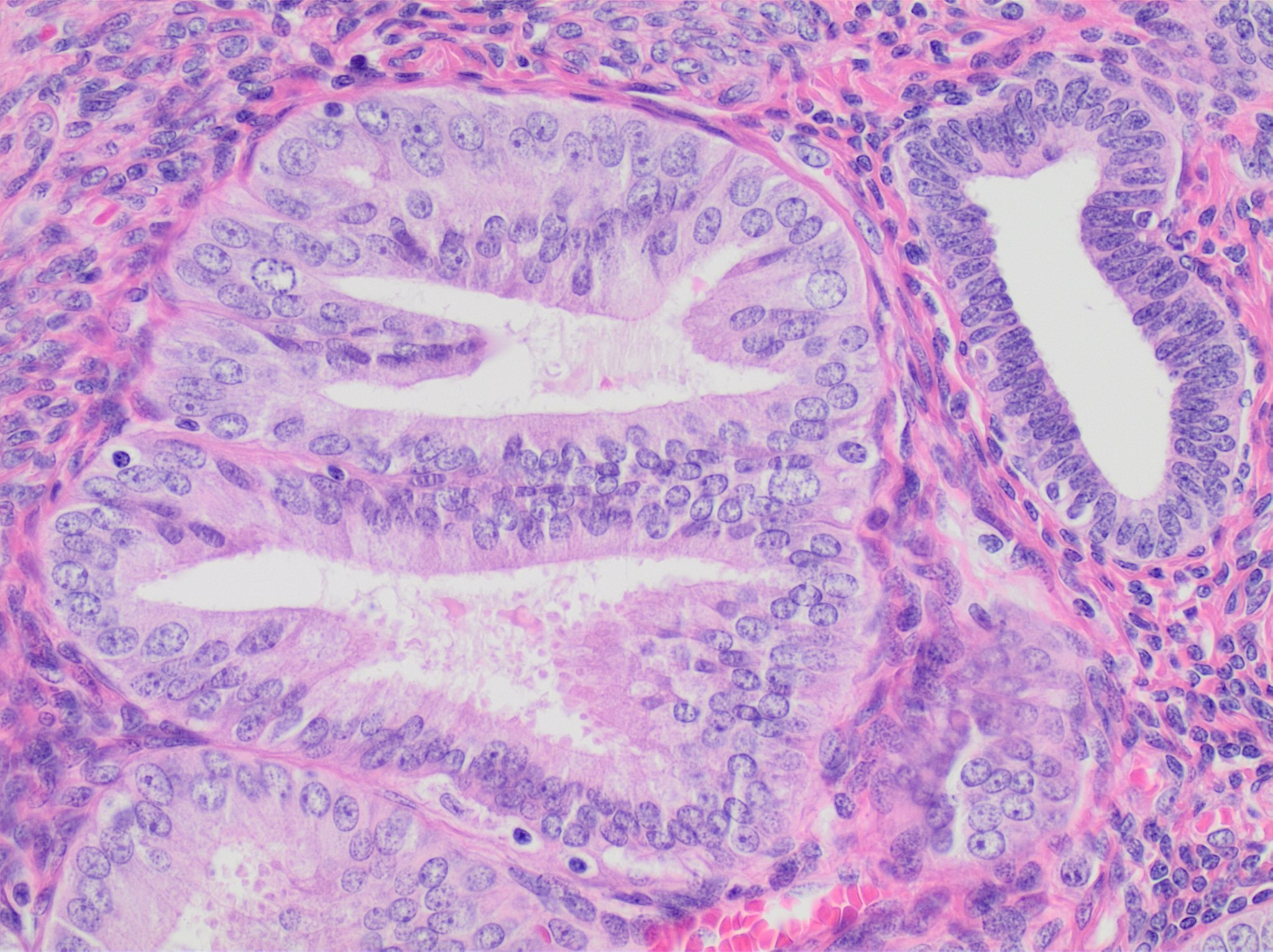
Histopathology of endometrial intraepithelial neoplasia (EIN), with its typical features: Architectural gland crowding; Altered cytology relative to background glands; Minimum size of 1 mm; Exclusion of adenocarcinoma; Exclusion of mimics; Mitoses should also preferably be seen. Compare to normal endometrial gland at right.

Endometrial intraepithelial neoplasia (EIN) is a premalignant lesion of the uterine lining that predisposes to endometrioid endometrial adenocarcinoma. It is composed of a collection of abnormal endometrial cells, arising from the glands that line the uterus, which have a tendency over time to progress to the most common form of uterine cancer—endometrial adenocarcinoma, endometrioid type.

== History ==
EIN lesions have been discovered by a combination of molecular, histologic, and clinical outcome studies beginning in the 1990s which provide a multifaceted characterization of this disease. They are a subset of a larger mixed group of lesions previously called "endometrial hyperplasia". The EIN diagnostic schema is intended to replace the previous "endometrial hyperplasia" classification as defined by the World Health Organization in 1994, which have been separated into benign (benign endometrial hyperplasia) and premalignant (EIN) classes in accordance with their behavior and clinical management.
EIN should not be confused with an unrelated entity, serous intraepithelial carcinoma ("serous EIC"), which is an early stage of a different tumor type known as papillary serous adenocarcinoma that also occurs in the same location within the uterus.

== Clinical aspects ==
The average age at time of EIN diagnosis is approximately 52 years, compared to approximately 61 years for carcinoma. The timeframe and likelihood of EIN progression to cancer, however, is not constant amongst all women. Some cases of EIN are first detected as residual premalignant disease in women who already have carcinoma, whereas other EIN lesions disappear entirely and never lead to cancer. For this reason, treatment benefits and risks must be individualized for each patient under the guidance of an experienced physician.

Risk factors for development of EIN and the endometrioid type of endometrial carcinoma include exposure to estrogens without opposing progestins, obesity, diabetes, and rare hereditary conditions such as hereditary nonpolyposis colorectal cancer. Protective factors include use of combined oral contraceptive pills (low dose estrogen and progestin), and prior use of a contraceptive intrauterine device.

== Biology ==
EIN lesions demonstrate all of the behaviors and characteristics of a premalignant, or precancerous, lesion.

Precancer Features of EIN (Table I). The cells of an EIN lesion are genetically different than normal and malignant tissues, and have a distinctive appearance under the light microscope. EIN cells are already neoplastic, demonstrating a monoclonal growth pattern and clonally distributed mutations. Progression of EIN to carcinoma, effectively a conversion from a benign neoplasm to a malignant neoplasm, is accomplished through acquisition of additional mutations and accompanied by a change in behavior characterized by the ability to invade local tissues and metastasize to regional and distant sites.

Table I: Precancer Characteristics of EIN

Precancer Characteristics	EIN Evidence
Precancers differ from normal tissue	Monoclonal EIN arise from polyclonal normal field.; Mutations are acquired in EIN.
Precancers share some, but not all, features of cancer	EIN-cancer lineage hierarchy; EIN may share PTEN, K-ras, MLH1 changes with cancer.; Both EIN and cancer are monoclonal.
Precancers increase risk for carcinoma	Elevated concurrent cancer rate (39% in first year after EIN diagnosis); EIN elevates future cancer risk 45-fold.
Precancers can be diagnosed	Morphometric reference standard (D-Score) for EIN diagnosis.; Subjective EIN diagnosis using criteria (Table 2).
Cancer must arise from cells within the precancer	EIN-cancer lineage hierarchy.; EIN may share PTEN, K-ras, MLH1 changes with resultant cancer.

EIN Biomarkers. (Figure 1). There are no single biomarkers which are completely informative in recognition of EIN. The tumour suppressor gene PTEN is frequently inactivated in EIN, being abnormally turned off in approximately 2/3 of all EIN lesions. This can be seen with special tissue stains applied to histological sections known as PTEN immunohistochemistry, in which the brown PTEN protein is seen to be absent in the crowded tubular glands that make up an EIN lesion.

== Diagnosis ==
Diagnosis of EIN lesions is of clinical importance because of the increased risk of coexisting (39% of women with EIN will be diagnosed with carcinoma within one year) or future (the long term endometrial cancer risk is 45 times greater for a woman with EIN compared to one with only a benign endometrial histology) endometrial cancer. Diagnostic terminology is that used by pathologists, physicians who diagnose human disease by examination of histologic preparations of excised tissues. Critical distinctions in EIN diagnosis are separation from benign conditions such as benign endometrial hyperplasia (a field effect in endometrial tissue caused by excessive stimulation by the hormone estrogen), and cancer.

The spectrum of disease which must be distinguished from EIN (Table II) includes benign endometrial hyperplasia and carcinoma:

Table II: Disease classes that need to be distinguished from EIN.

Disease Class	Endometrial Topography	Functional Category	Treatment
Benign endometrial hyperplasia	Diffuse	Hormone (estrogen); Effect	Hormonal therapy
EIN, Endometrial; Intraepithelial; Neoplasia	Focal progressing to diffuse (clonal)	Precancer	Hormonal or surgical
Endometrial; Adenocarcinoma	Focal progressing to diffuse (clonal)	Cancer	Surgical stage-based

EIN may be diagnosed by a trained pathologist by examination of tissue sections of the endometrium. All of the following diagnostic criteria must be met in a single area of one tissue fragment to make the diagnosis (Table III).

Table III: EIN diagnosis.

	EIN Criterion	Comments
1	Architecture	Gland area exceeds that of stroma, usually in a localized region.
2	Cytological; Alterations	Cytology differs between architecturally crowded focus and background.
3	Size greater than 1mm	Minimum linear dimension should exceed 1mm. Smaller lesions have unknown natural history.
4	Exclude mimics	Basalis, normal secretory, polyps, repair, lower uterine segment, cystic atrophy, tangential sections, menstrual collapse, disruption artifact, etc.
5	Exclude Cancer	Carcinoma should be diagnosed if: glands are mazelike and rambling, there are solid areas of epithelial growth, or there are significant bridges or cribriform areas.

== See also ==
- Uterine cancer
