= Endometrial cancer =

Uterine cancer that is located in tissues lining the uterus

- Other names: Uterine cancer
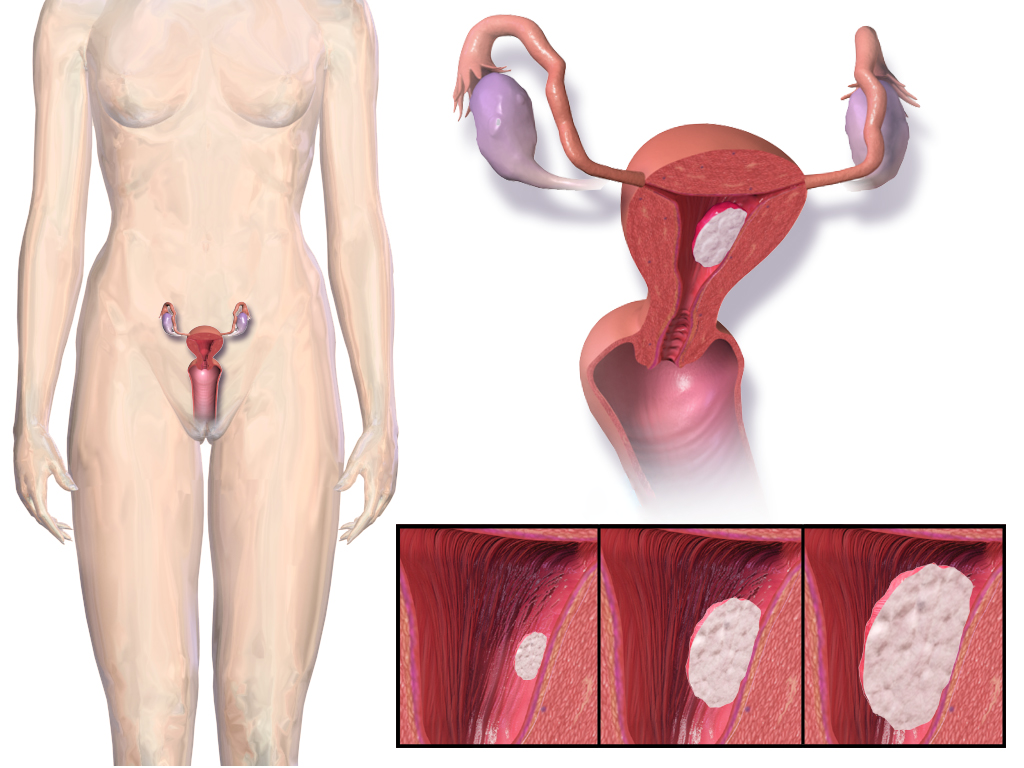
- The location and development of endometrial cancer
- Specialty: Oncology, gynecology
- Symptoms: Vaginal bleeding, pain with urination or sexual intercourse, pelvic pain
- Usual onset: After menopause
- Risk factors: Obesity, excessive estrogen exposure, high blood pressure, diabetes, family history
- Diagnostic method: Endometrial biopsy
- Treatment: Abdominal hysterectomy, radiation therapy, chemotherapy, hormone therapy
- Prognosis: Five-year survival rate ~80% (US)
- Frequency: 3.8 million (total affected in 2015)
- Deaths: 89,900 (2015)

Endometrial cancer is a cancer that arises from the endometrium (the lining of the uterus or womb). It is the result of the abnormal growth of cells that can invade or spread to other parts of the body. The first sign is most often vaginal bleeding not associated with a menstrual period. Other symptoms include pain with urination, pain during sexual intercourse, or pelvic pain. Endometrial cancer occurs most commonly after menopause.

Approximately 40% of cases are related to obesity. Endometrial cancer is also associated with excessive estrogen exposure, high blood pressure and diabetes. Whereas taking estrogen alone increases the risk of endometrial cancer, taking both estrogen and a progestogen in combination, as in most birth control pills, decreases the risk. Between two and five percent of cases are related to genes inherited from the parents. Endometrial cancer is sometimes called "uterine cancer", although it is distinct from other forms of cancer of the uterus such as cervical cancer, uterine sarcoma, and trophoblastic disease. The most frequent type of endometrial cancer is endometrioid carcinoma, which accounts for more than 80% of cases. Endometrial cancer is commonly diagnosed by endometrial biopsy or by taking samples during a procedure known as dilation and curettage. A pap smear is not typically sufficient to show endometrial cancer. Regular screening in those at normal risk is not called for.

The leading treatment option for endometrial cancer is abdominal hysterectomy (the total removal by surgery of the uterus), together with removal of the Fallopian tubes and ovaries on both sides, called a bilateral salpingo-oophorectomy. In more advanced cases, radiation therapy, chemotherapy or hormone therapy may also be recommended. If the disease is diagnosed at an early stage, the outcome is favorable, and the overall five-year survival rate in the United States is greater than 80%.

In 2012, endometrial cancers newly occurred in 320,000 women and caused 76,000 deaths. This makes it the third most common cause of death in cancers which only affect women, behind ovarian and cervical cancer. It is more common in the developed world and is the most common cancer of the female reproductive tract in developed countries. Rates of endometrial cancer have risen in several countries between the 1980s and 2010. This is believed to be due to the increasing number of elderly people and rising obesity rates.

Video overview of endometrial cancer

== Signs and symptoms ==
Vaginal bleeding or spotting in women after menopause occurs in 90% of endometrial cancer. Bleeding is quite common with adenocarcinoma, occurring in two-thirds of all cases. Abnormal menstrual cycles or extremely long, heavy, or frequent episodes of bleeding in women before menopause may also be a sign of endometrial cancer.

Symptoms other than bleeding are not common. Other symptoms include thin white or clear vaginal discharge in postmenopausal women. More advanced disease shows more obvious symptoms or signs that can be detected on a physical examination. The uterus may become enlarged or the cancer may spread, causing lower abdominal pain or pelvic cramping. Painful sexual intercourse or painful or difficult urination are less common signs of endometrial cancer. The uterus may also fill with pus (pyometrea). Of women with these less common symptoms (vaginal discharge, pelvic pain, and pus), 10–15% have cancer.

== Risk factors ==
Risk factors for endometrial cancer include obesity, insulin resistance and diabetes mellitus, breast cancer, use of tamoxifen, never having had a child, late menopause, high levels of estrogen, and increasing age. Immigration studies (migration studies), which examine the change in cancer risk in populations moving between countries with different rates of cancer, show that there is some environmental component to endometrial cancer. These environmental risk factors are not well characterized. It is found that adiposity is associated with the earlier diagnosis of EC, particularly the endometrioid subtype.

=== Hormones ===
Most of the risk factors for endometrial cancer involve high levels of estrogens. An estimated 40% of cases are thought to be related to obesity. In obesity, the excess of adipose tissue increases conversion of androstenedione into estrone, an estrogen. Higher levels of estrone in the blood causes less or no ovulation and exposes the endometrium continuously to high levels of estrogens. Obesity also causes less estrogen to be removed from the blood. Polyendocrine metabolic ovarian syndrome (PMOS), which also causes irregular or no ovulation, is associated with higher rates of endometrial cancer for the same reasons as obesity. Specifically, obesity, type II diabetes, and insulin resistance are risk factors for Type I endometrial cancer. Obesity increases the risk for endometrial cancer by 300–400%.

Hormone replacement therapy is the most effective treatment for menopausal vasomotor and genitourinary symptoms, but its use in women with endometrial cancer is approached cautiously. Estrogen replacement therapy during menopause when not balanced (or "opposed") with progestin is another risk factor. Higher doses or longer periods of estrogen therapy have higher risks of endometrial cancer. Women of lower weight are at greater risk from unopposed estrogen. A longer period of fertility—either from an early first menstrual period or late menopause—is also a risk factor. Unopposed estrogen raises an individual's risk of endometrial cancer by 2–10 fold, depending on weight and length of therapy. In trans men who take testosterone and have not had a hysterectomy, the conversion of testosterone into estrogen via androstenedione may lead to a higher risk of endometrial cancer. Higher circulating testosterone levels in women have also been identified as an independent endometrial cancer risk factor. Having endometriosis is also associated with increased risk.

=== Genetics ===
The autosomal dominant inheritance pattern seen in Lynch syndrome

Genetic disorders can also cause endometrial cancer. Overall, hereditary causes contribute to 2–10% of endometrial cancer cases. Lynch syndrome, an autosomal dominant genetic disorder that mainly causes colorectal cancer, also causes endometrial cancer, especially before menopause. Women with Lynch syndrome have a 40–60% risk of developing endometrial cancer, higher than their risk of developing colorectal (bowel) or ovarian cancer. Ovarian and endometrial cancer develop simultaneously in 20% of people. Endometrial cancer nearly always develops before colon cancer, on average, 11 years before. Carcinogenesis in Lynch syndrome comes from a mutation in MLH1 or MLH2: genes that participate in the process of mismatch repair, which allows a cell to correct mistakes in the DNA. Other genes mutated in Lynch syndrome include MSH2, MSH6, and PMS2, which are also mismatch repair genes. Women with Lynch syndrome represent 2–3% of endometrial cancer cases; some sources place this as high as 5%. Depending on the gene mutation, women with Lynch syndrome have different risks of endometrial cancer. With MLH1 mutations, the risk is 54%; with MSH2, 21%; and with MSH6, 16%.

Women with a family history of endometrial cancer are at higher risk. Two genes most commonly associated with some other women's cancers, BRCA1 and BRCA2, do not cause endometrial cancer. There is an apparent link with these genes. It is attributable to the use of tamoxifen, a drug that itself can cause endometrial cancer, in breast and ovarian cancers. The inherited genetic condition Cowden syndrome can also cause endometrial cancer. Women with this disorder have a 5–10% lifetime risk of developing endometrial cancer, compared to the 2–3% risk for unaffected women.

Common genetic variation has also been found to affect endometrial cancer risk in large-scale genome-wide association studies. Sixteen genomic regions have been associated with endometrial cancer and the common variants explain up to 7% of the familial relative risk.

=== Other health problems ===
Some therapies for other forms of cancer increase the lifetime risk of endometrial cancer, which is a baseline 2–3%. Tamoxifen, a drug used to treat estrogen-positive breast cancers, has been associated with endometrial cancer in approximately 0.1% of users, particularly older women. The benefits for survival from tamoxifen generally outweigh the risk of endometrial cancer. A one to two-year course of tamoxifen approximately doubles the risk of endometrial cancer, and a five-year course of therapy quadruples that risk. Raloxifene, a similar drug, did not raise the risk of endometrial cancer. Previously having ovarian cancer is a risk factor for endometrial cancer, as is having had previous radiotherapy to the pelvis. Specifically, ovarian granulosa cell tumors and thecomas are tumors associated with endometrial cancer.

Low immune function has also been implicated in endometrial cancer. High blood pressure is also a risk factor, but this may be because of its association with obesity. Sitting regularly for prolonged periods is associated with higher mortality from endometrial cancer. The risk is not negated by regular exercise, though it is lowered.

=== Protective factors ===
Smoking alters the metabolism of estrogen, suppresses appetite, and is associated with early menopause. These correlations are considered to be a protective factor. Progestin is present in the combined oral contraceptive pill and the hormonal intrauterine device (IUD). Combined oral contraceptives reduce risk more the longer they are taken: by 56% after four years, 67% after eight years, and 72% after twelve years. This risk reduction continues for at least fifteen years after contraceptive use has been stopped. Obese women may need higher doses of progestin to be protected. Having had more than five infants (grand multiparity) is also a protective factor, and having at least one child reduces the risk by 35%. Breastfeeding for more than 18 months reduces risk by 23%. Increased physical activity reduces an individual's risk by 38–46%. There is preliminary evidence that consumption of soy is protective. Mendelian randomization analyses have established potential protective factors such as LDL cholesterol, later age of menarche and sex hormone binding globulin.

== Pathophysiology ==
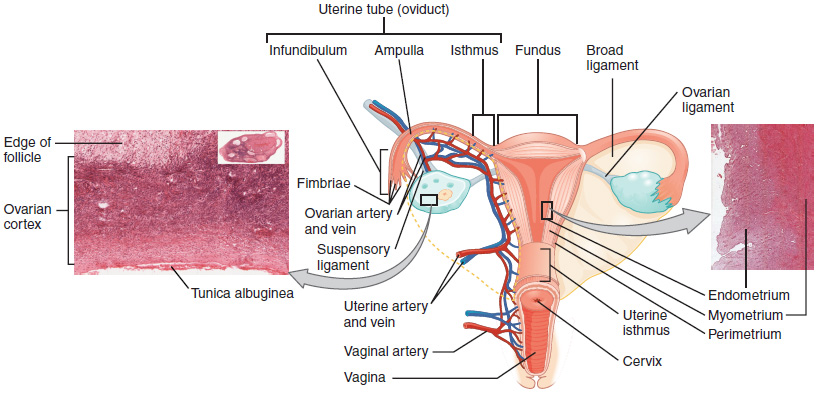
A diagram showing the female reproductive tract with the uterine wall enlarged and normal endometrium visible

Mutations found in Type I and Type II endometrial cancers
Gene mutated	Mutation type	Type I prevalence	Type II prevalence
ARID1A	point mutation	40%	unknown
CTNNB1	point mutation	14–44%	unknown
FGFR2	point mutation	16%	unknown
KRAS	point mutation	10–20%	unknown
PIK3R1	point mutation	43%	unknown
TP53	point mutation	10–20%	90%
PTEN	point mutation	37–61%	unknown
MLH1	epigenetic silencing	30%	unknown
RASSF1A	epigenetic silencing	48%	unknown
SPRY2	epigenetic silencing	20%	unknown
PPP2R1A	point mutation	unknown	17–41%
CDH1	loss of heterozygosity	unknown	80–90%
CDKN2A	loss of heterozygosity or epigenetic silencing	20%	40%
PIK3CA (oncogene)	point mutation or amplification	24–39%	20–30%
PIK3R1 (oncogene)	point mutation	unknown	12%
STK15 (oncogene)	amplification	unknown	60%
CCNE1 (oncogene)	amplification	unknown	55%
ERBB2 (oncogene)	amplification	unknown	30%
CCND1 (oncogene)	amplification	unknown	26%

Endometrial cancer forms when there are errors in normal endometrial cell growth. Usually, when cells grow old or get damaged, they die, and new cells take their place. Cancer starts when new cells form unneeded, and old or damaged cells do not die as they should. The buildup of extra cells often forms a mass of tissue called a growth or tumor. These abnormal cancer cells have many genetic abnormalities that cause them to grow excessively.

In 10–20% of endometrial cancers, mostly Grade 3 (the highest histologic grade), mutations are found in a tumor suppressor gene, commonly p53 or PTEN. In 20% of endometrial hyperplasias and 50% of endometrioid cancers, PTEN has a loss-of-function mutation or a null mutation, making it less effective or completely ineffective. Loss of PTEN function leads to up-regulation of the PI3k/Akt/mTOR pathway, which causes cell growth. The p53 pathway can either be suppressed or highly activated in endometrial cancer. When a mutant version of p53 is overexpressed, the cancer tends to be particularly aggressive. P53 mutations and chromosome instability are associated with serous carcinomas, which tend to resemble ovarian and Fallopian carcinomas. Serous carcinomas are thought to develop from endometrial intraepithelial carcinoma.

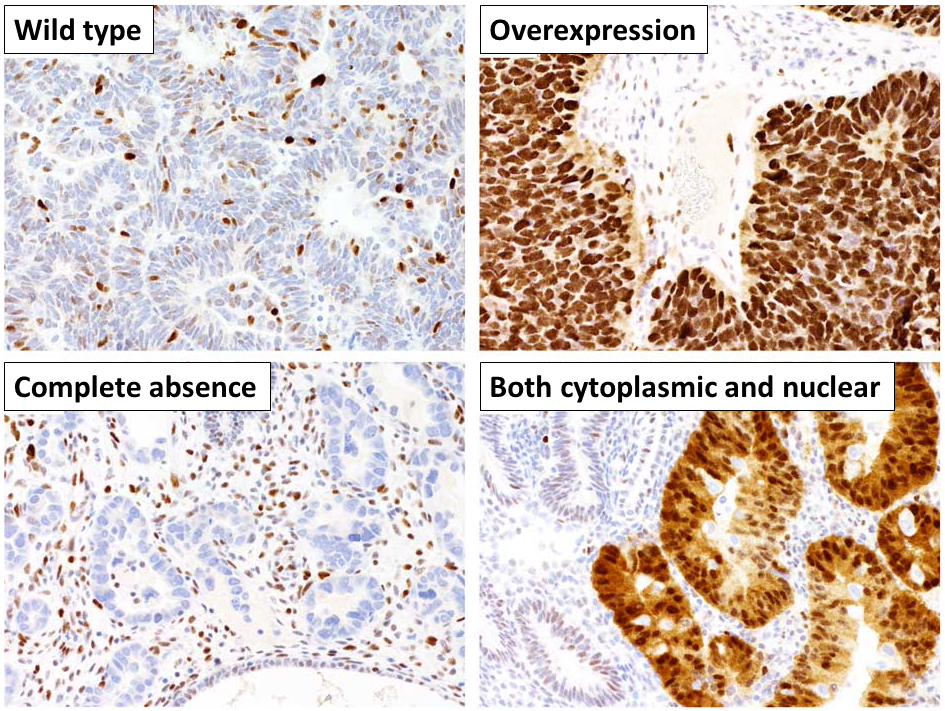
Different patterns of p53 expression in endometrial cancers on chromogenic immunohistochemistry, whereof all except wild-type are variably termed abnormal/aberrant/mutation-type and are strongly predictive of an underlying TP53 mutation:

PTEN and p27 loss of function mutations are associated with a good prognosis, particularly in obese women. The Her2/neu oncogene, which indicates a poor prognosis, is expressed in 20% of endometrioid and serous carcinomas. CTNNB1 (beta-catenin; a transcription gene) mutations are found in 14–44% of endometrial cancers and may indicate a good prognosis, but the data is unclear. Beta-catenin mutations are commonly found in endometrial cancers with squamous cells. FGFR2 mutations are found in approximately 10% of endometrial cancers, and their prognostic significance is unclear. SPOP is another tumor suppressor gene found to be mutated in some cases of endometrial cancer: 9% of clear cell endometrial carcinomas and 8% of serous endometrial carcinomas have mutations in this gene.

Type I and Type II cancers (explained below) tend to have different mutations involved. ARID1A, which often carries a point mutation in Type I endometrial cancer, is also mutated in 26% of clear cell carcinomas of the endometrium and 18% of serous carcinomas. Epigenetic silencing and point mutations of several genes are commonly found in Type I endometrial cancer. Mutations in tumor suppressor genes are common in Type II endometrial cancer. PIK3CA is commonly mutated in both Type I and Type II cancers. In women with Lynch syndrome-associated endometrial cancer, microsatellite instability is common.

Development of an endometrial hyperplasia (overgrowth of endometrial cells) is a significant risk factor because hyperplasias can and often do develop into adenocarcinoma, though cancer can develop without the presence of a hyperplasia. Within ten years, 8–30% of atypical endometrial hyperplasias develop into cancer, whereas 1–3% of non-atypical hyperplasias do so. An atypical hyperplasia is one with visible abnormalities in the nuclei. Pre-cancerous endometrial hyperplasias are also referred to as endometrial intraepithelial neoplasia. Mutations in the KRAS gene can cause endometrial hyperplasia and therefore Type I endometrial cancer. Endometrial hyperplasia typically occurs after the age of 40. Endometrial glandular dysplasia occurs with an overexpression of p53, and develops into a serous carcinoma.

== Diagnosis ==
Diagnosis of endometrial cancer is made first by a physical examination, endometrial biopsy, or dilation and curettage (removal of endometrial tissue; D&C). This tissue is then examined histologically for characteristics of cancer. If cancer is found, medical imaging may be done to see whether the cancer has spread or invaded tissues like the myometrium (the muscular wall of the womb) or the uterine cervix. A study from 2024 indicates that transvaginal ultrasound provides diagnostic performance comparable to magnetic resonance imaging regarding the myometrial infiltration assessment. However, magnetic resonance imaging showed significantly better specificity in low-grade endometrial cancer.

=== Examination ===
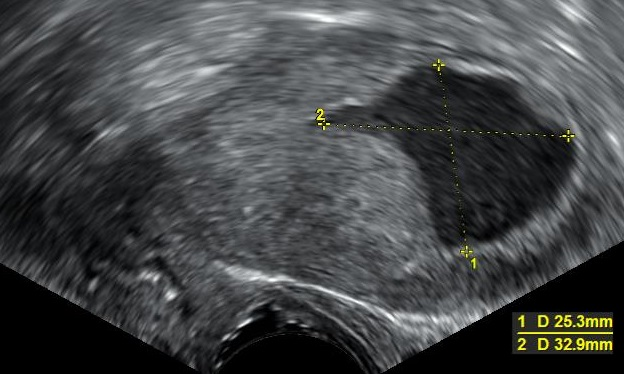
Vaginal ultrasonography with an endometrial fluid accumulation (darker area) in a postmenopausal uterus, a finding that is highly suspicious for endometrial cancer

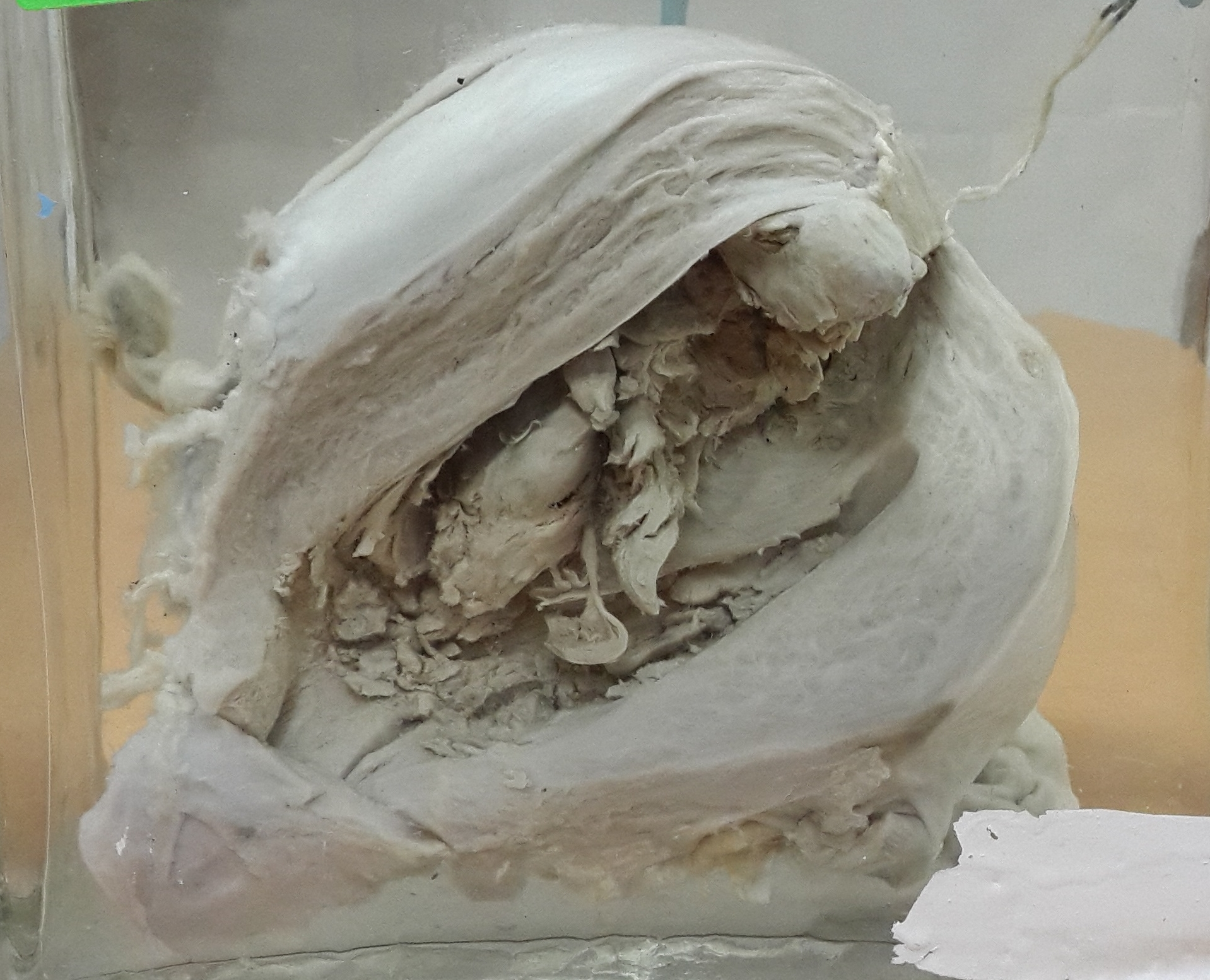
Polypoidal endometrial carcinoma

Routine screening of asymptomatic people is not indicated since the disease is highly curable in its early, symptomatic stages. Instead, women, particularly menopausal women, should be aware of the symptoms and risk factors of endometrial cancer. A cervical screening test, such as a Pap smear, is not a useful diagnostic tool for endometrial cancer because the smear will be normal 50% of the time. A Pap smear can detect disease that has spread to the cervix. Results from a pelvic examination are frequently normal, especially in the early stages of disease. Changes in the size, shape, or consistency of the uterus or its surrounding, supporting structures may exist when the disease is more advanced. Cervical stenosis, the narrowing of the cervical opening, is a sign of endometrial cancer when pus or blood is found collected in the uterus (pyometra or hematometra).

Women with Lynch syndrome should begin to have annual biopsy screening at the age of 35. Some women with Lynch syndrome elect to have a prophylactic hysterectomy and salpingo-oophorectomy to greatly reduce the risk of endometrial and ovarian cancer.

Transvaginal ultrasound to examine the endometrial thickness in women with postmenopausal bleeding is increasingly being used to aid in the diagnosis of endometrial cancer in the United States. In the United Kingdom, both an endometrial biopsy and a transvaginal ultrasound used in conjunction are the standard of care for diagnosing endometrial cancer. The homogeneity of the tissue visible on transvaginal ultrasound can help to indicate whether the thickness is cancerous. Ultrasound findings alone are not conclusive in cases of endometrial cancer, so another screening method (for example, endometrial biopsy) must be used in conjunction. Other imaging studies are of limited use. CT scans are used for preoperative imaging of tumors that appear advanced on physical exam or have a high-risk subtype (at high risk of metastasis). They can also be used to investigate extrapelvic disease. An MRI can be of some use in determining if the cancer has spread to the cervix or if it is an endocervical adenocarcinoma. MRI is also useful for examining the nearby lymph nodes.

Dilation and curettage or an endometrial biopsy are used to obtain a tissue sample for histological examination. Endometrial biopsy is the less invasive option, but it may not give conclusive results every time. Hysteroscopy only shows the gross anatomy of the endometrium, which is often not indicative of cancer and is, therefore, not used unless in conjunction with a biopsy. Hysteroscopy can be used to confirm a diagnosis of cancer. New evidence shows that D&C has a higher false negative rate than endometrial biopsy.

Before treatment is begun, several other investigations are recommended. These include a chest x-ray, liver function tests, kidney function tests, and a test for levels of CA-125, a tumor marker that can be elevated in endometrial cancer.

=== Classification ===
Endometrial cancers may be tumors derived from epithelial cells (carcinomas), mixed epithelial and mesenchymal tumors (carcinosarcomas), or mesenchymal tumors.

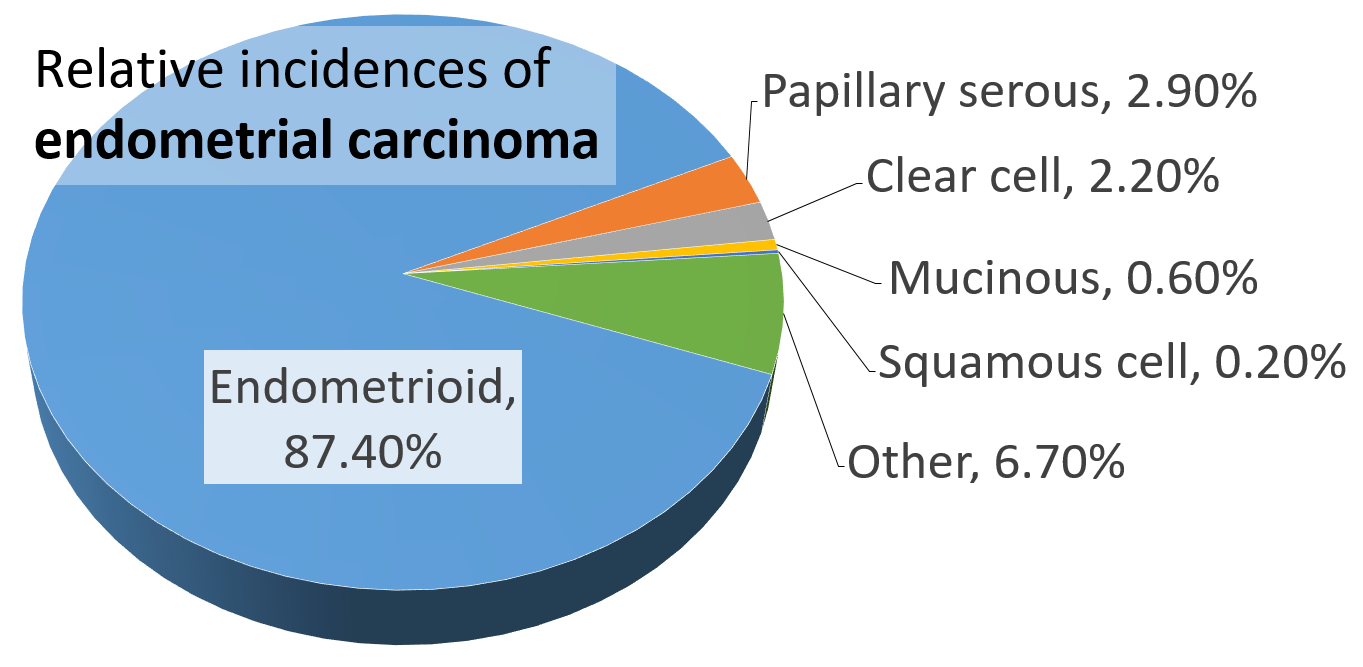
Relative incidences of endometrial carcinomas by histopathology

Traditional classification of endometrial carcinomas is based either on clinical and endocrine features (Type I and Type II) or histopathological characteristics (endometrioid, serous, and clear-cell). Some tumors are difficult to classify and have features overlapping more than one category. High-grade endometrioid tumors, in particular, tend to have both type I and type II features.

==== Carcinoma ====
The vast majority of endometrial cancers are carcinomas (usually adenocarcinomas), meaning that they originate from the single layer of epithelial cells that line the endometrium and form the endometrial glands. There are many microscopic subtypes of endometrial carcinoma, but they are broadly organized into two categories, Type I and Type II, based on clinical features and pathogenesis. The two subtypes are genetically distinct.

Type I endometrial carcinomas occur most commonly before and around the time of menopause. In the United States, they are more common in white women, particularly those with a history of endometrial hyperplasia. Type I endometrial cancers are often low-grade, minimally invasive into the underlying uterine wall (myometrium), estrogen-dependent, and have a good outcome with treatment. Type I carcinomas represent 75–90% of endometrial cancer.

Type II endometrial carcinomas usually occur in older, post-menopausal people. In the United States, they are more common in black women and are not associated with increased exposure to estrogen or a history of endometrial hyperplasia. Type II endometrial cancers are often high-grade, with deep invasion into the underlying uterine wall (myometrium), are of the serous or clear cell type, and carry a poorer prognosis. They can appear to be epithelial ovarian cancer on evaluation of symptoms. They tend to present later than Type I tumors and are more aggressive, with a greater risk of relapse and/or metastasis.

===== Endometrioid adenocarcinoma =====
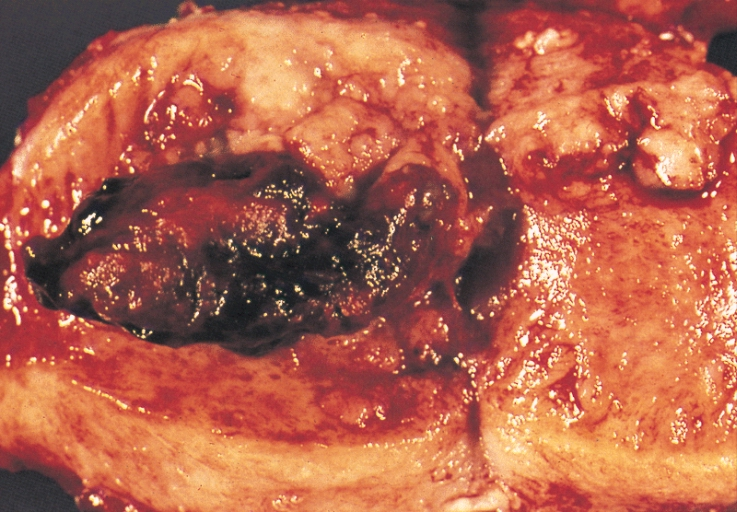
Gross pathology of an endometrial adenocarcinoma

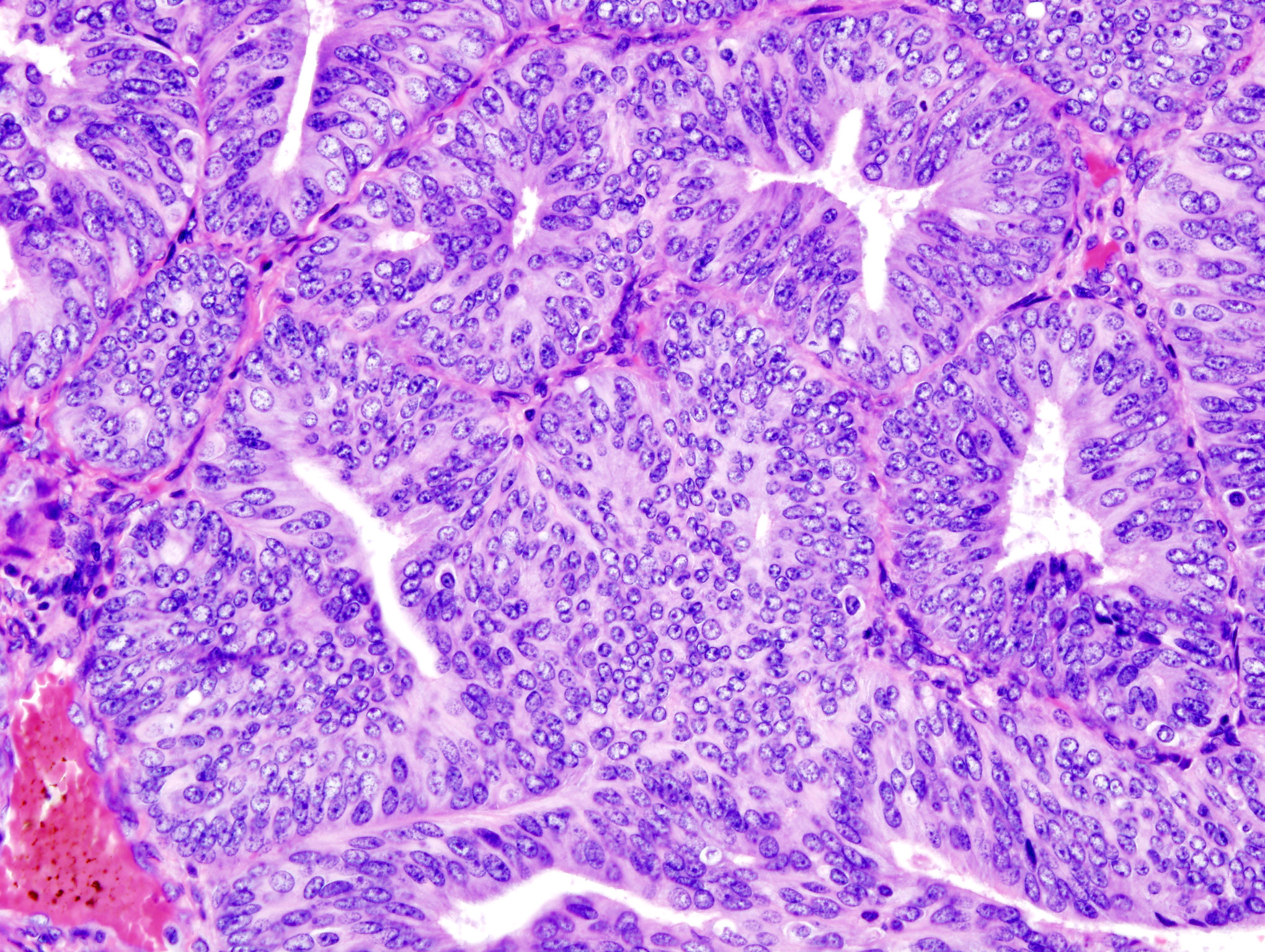
A histologic view of an endometrial adenocarcinoma showing many abnormal nuclei

In endometrioid adenocarcinoma, the cancer cells grow in patterns reminiscent of normal endometrium, with many new glands formed from columnar epithelium with some abnormal nuclei. Low-grade endometrioid adenocarcinomas have well-differentiated cells, have not invaded the myometrium, and are seen alongside endometrial hyperplasia. The tumor's glands form very close together, without the stromal tissue that normally separates them. Higher-grade endometrioid adenocarcinomas have less well-differentiated cells, have more solid sheets of tumor cells no longer organized into glands, and are associated with an atrophied endometrium. There are several subtypes of endometrioid adenocarcinoma with similar prognoses, including villoglandular, secretory, and ciliated cell variants. There is also a subtype characterized by squamous differentiation. Some endometrioid adenocarcinomas have foci of mucinous carcinoma.

The genetic mutations most commonly associated with endometrioid adenocarcinoma are in the genes PTEN, a tumor suppressor; PIK3CA, a kinase; KRAS, a GTPase that functions in signal transduction; and CTNNB1, involved in adhesion and cell signaling. The CTNNB1 (beta-catenin) gene is most commonly mutated in the squamous subtype of endometrioid adenocarcinoma.

===== Serous carcinoma =====
Serous carcinoma is a Type II endometrial tumor that makes up 5–10% of diagnosed endometrial cancer and is common in postmenopausal women with atrophied endometrium and black women. Serous endometrial carcinoma is aggressive and often invades the myometrium and metastasizes within the peritoneum (seen as omental caking) or the lymphatic system. Histologically, it appears with many atypical nuclei, papillary structures, and, in contrast to endometrioid adenocarcinomas, rounded cells instead of columnar cells. Roughly 30% of endometrial serous carcinomas also have psammoma bodies. Serous carcinomas spread differently than most other endometrial cancers; they can spread outside the uterus without invading the myometrium.

The genetic mutations seen in serous carcinoma are chromosomal instability and mutations in TP53, an important tumor suppressor gene.

===== Clear cell carcinoma =====
Clear cell carcinoma is a Type II endometrial tumor that makes up less than 5% of diagnosed endometrial cancer. Like serous cell carcinoma, it is usually aggressive and carries a poor prognosis. Histologically, it is characterized by the features common to all clear cells: the eponymous clear cytoplasm when H&E stained and visible, distinct cell membranes. The p53 cell signaling system is not active in endometrial clear cell carcinoma. This form of endometrial cancer is more common in postmenopausal women.

===== Mucinous carcinoma =====
Mucinous carcinomas are a rare form of endometrial cancer, making up less than 1–2% of all diagnosed endometrial cancers. Mucinous endometrial carcinomas are most often stage I and grade I, giving them a good prognosis. They typically have well-differentiated columnar cells organized into glands with the characteristic mucin in the cytoplasm. Mucinous carcinomas must be differentiated from cervical adenocarcinoma.

===== Mixed or undifferentiated carcinoma =====
Mixed carcinomas are those that have both Type I and Type II cells, with one making up at least 10% of the tumor. These include the malignant mixed Müllerian tumor, which derives from endometrial epithelium and has a poor prognosis.

Undifferentiated endometrial carcinomas make up less than 1–2% of diagnosed endometrial cancers. They have a worse prognosis than grade III tumors. Histologically, these tumors show sheets of identical epithelial cells with no identifiable pattern.

===== Other carcinomas =====
Non-metastatic squamous cell carcinoma and transitional cell carcinoma are very rare in the endometrium. Squamous cell carcinoma of the endometrium has a poor prognosis. It has been reported fewer than 100 times in the medical literature since its characterization in 1892. For primary squamous cell carcinoma of the endometrium (PSCCE) to be diagnosed, there must be no other primary cancer in the endometrium or cervix, and it must not be connected to the cervical epithelium. Because of the rarity of this cancer, there are no guidelines for how it should be treated, nor any typical treatment. The common genetic causes remain uncharacterized. Primary transitional cell carcinomas of the endometrium are even more rare; 16 cases had been reported as of 2008. Its pathophysiology and treatments have not been characterized. Histologically, TCCE resembles endometrioid carcinoma and is distinct from other transitional cell carcinomas.

==== Sarcoma ====
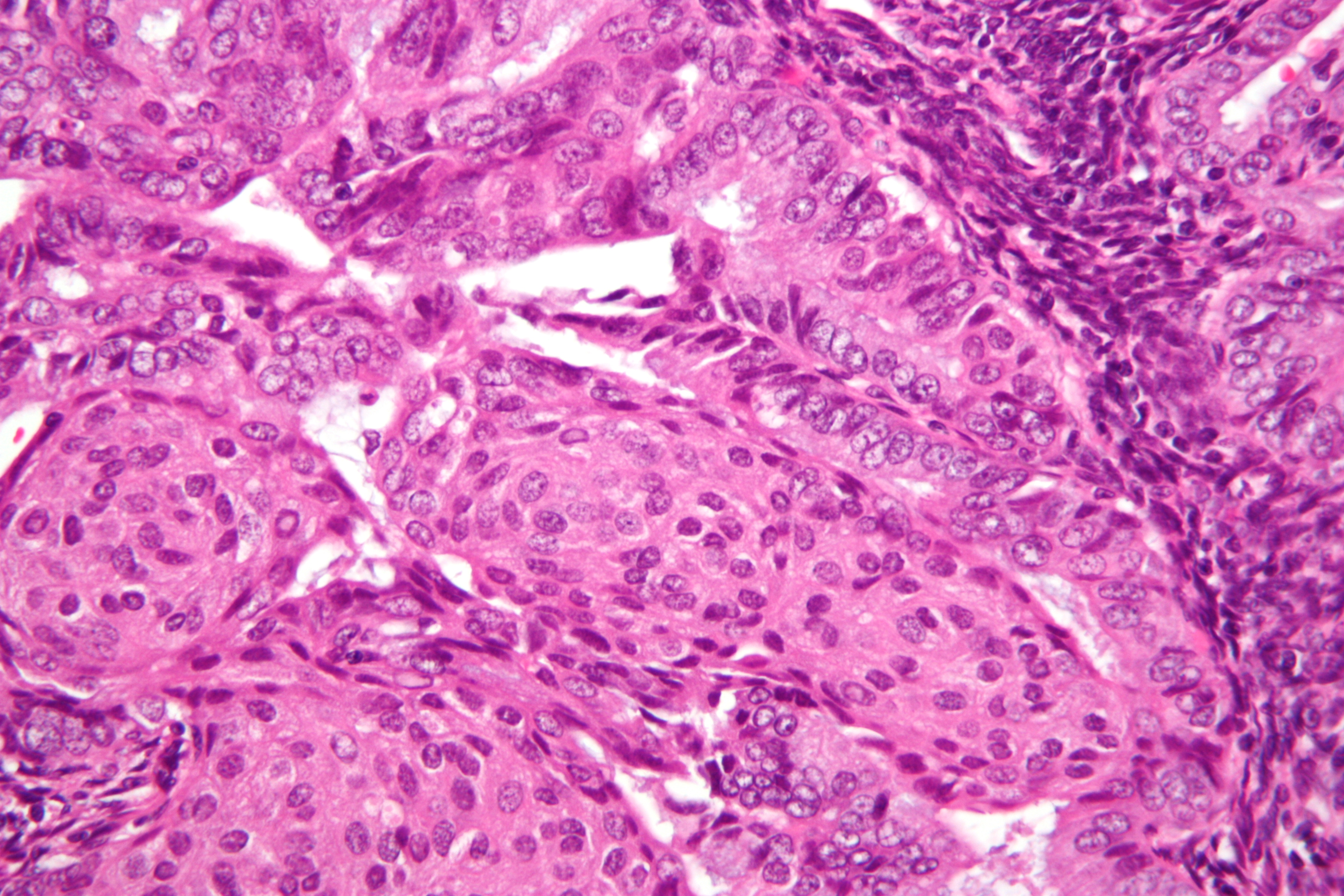
Endometrioid endometrial adenocarcinoma—very high magnification—H&E stain

In contrast to endometrial carcinomas, the uncommon endometrial stromal sarcomas are cancers that originate in the non-glandular connective tissue of the endometrium. They are generally non-aggressive and, if they recur, can take decades. Metastases to the lungs and pelvic or peritoneal cavities are the most frequent. They typically have estrogen and/or progesterone receptors. The prognosis for low-grade endometrial stromal sarcoma is good, with 60–90% five-year survival. High-grade undifferentiated endometrial sarcoma (HGUS) has a worse prognosis, with high rates of recurrence and 25% five-year survival. HGUS prognosis is dictated by whether or not the cancer has invaded the arteries and veins. Without vascular invasion, the five-year survival is 83%; it drops to 17% when vascular invasion is observed. Stage I ESS has the best prognosis, with a five-year survival rate of 98% and a ten-year survival rate of 89%. ESS makes up 0.2% of uterine cancers.

=== Metastasis ===
Endometrial cancer frequently metastasizes to the ovaries and Fallopian tubes when the cancer is located in the upper part of the uterus, and the cervix when the cancer is in the lower part of the uterus. The cancer usually first spreads into the myometrium and the serosa, then into other reproductive and pelvic structures. When the lymphatic system is involved, the pelvic and para-aortic nodes are usually first to become involved, but in no specific pattern, unlike cervical cancer. More distant metastases are spread by the blood and often occur in the lungs, as well as the liver, brain, and bone. Endometrial cancer metastasizes to the lungs 20–25% of the time, more than any other gynecologic cancer.

=== Histopathology ===
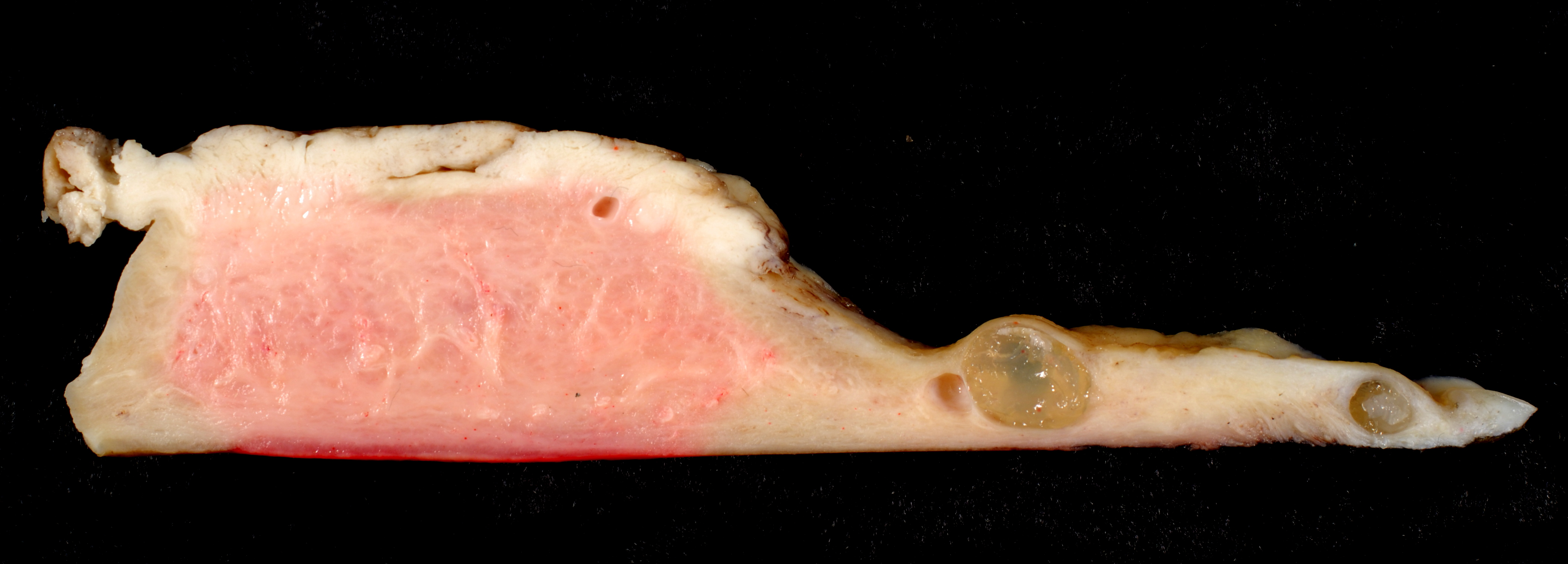
A stage I, grade I section of an endometrial cancer after hysterectomy.

There is a three-tiered system for histologically classifying endometrial cancers, ranging from cancers with well-differentiated cells (grade I), to very poorly-differentiated cells (grade III). Grade I cancers are the least aggressive and have the best prognosis, while grade III tumors are the most aggressive and likely to recur. Grade II cancers are intermediate between grades I and III in terms of cell differentiation and aggressiveness of disease. There is also a separate "nuclear grade" system, where grade 1 tumors have inconspicuous cell nuclei, whereas grade 3 tumors have highly atypical nuclei.

The histopathology of endometrial cancers is highly diverse. The most common finding is a well-differentiated endometrioid adenocarcinoma, which is composed of numerous, small, crowded glands with varying degrees of nuclear atypia, mitotic activity, and stratification. This often appears on a background of endometrial hyperplasia. Frank adenocarcinoma may be distinguished from atypical hyperplasia by the finding of clear stromal invasion, or "back-to-back" glands, which represent nondestructive replacement of the endometrial stroma by the cancer. With progression of the disease, the myometrium is infiltrated.

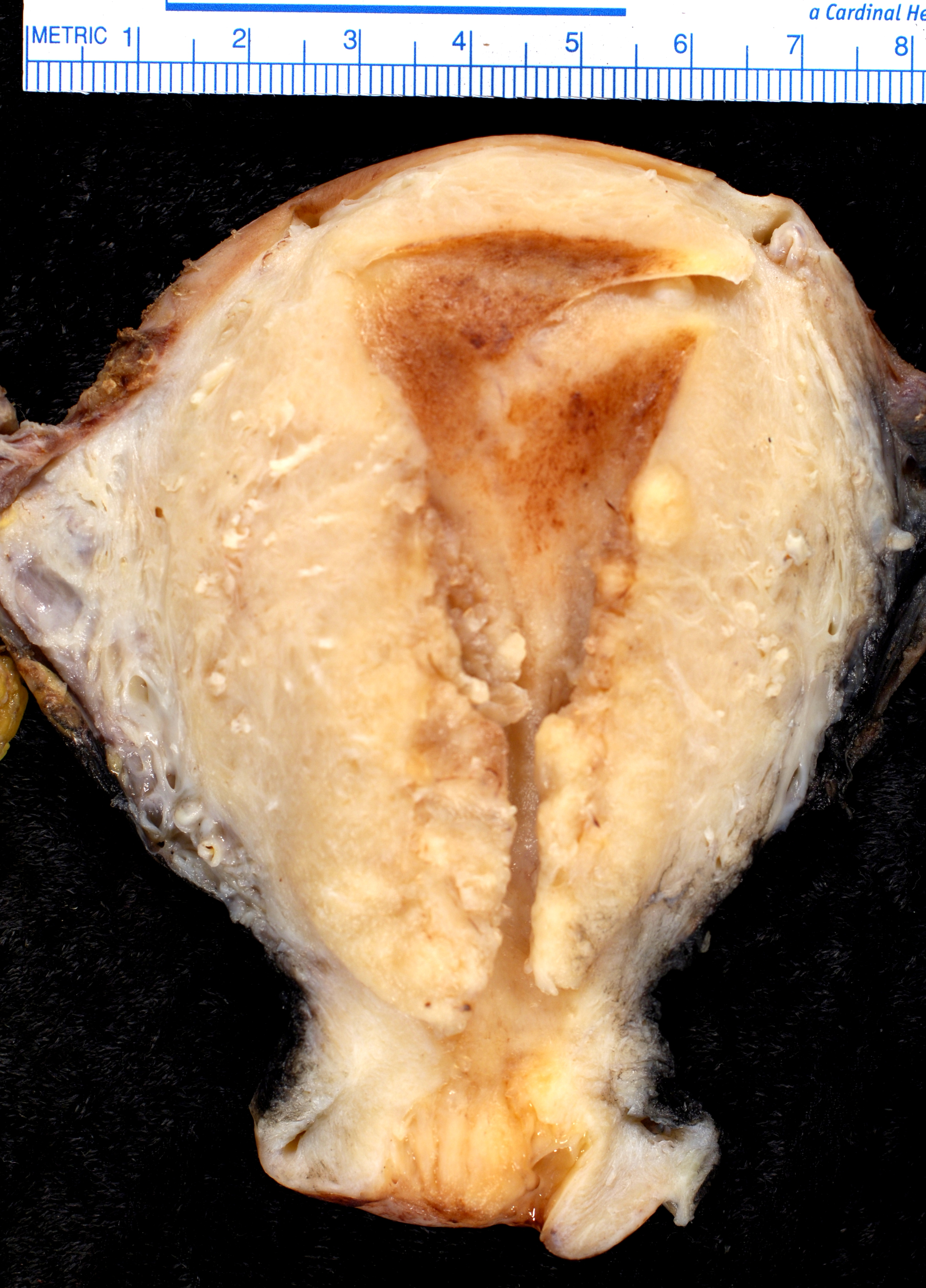
A stage III endometrioid adenocarcinoma that has invaded the myometrium

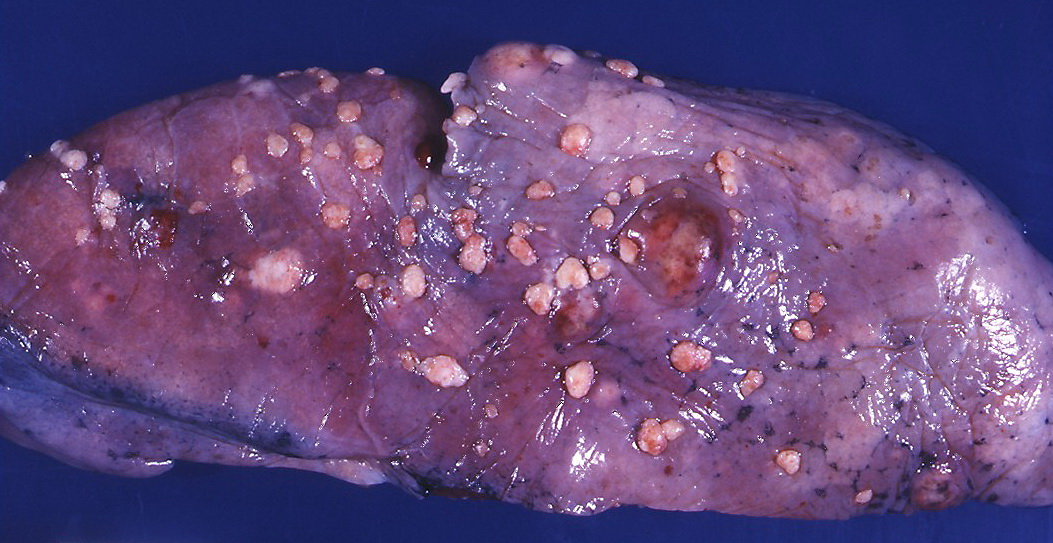
Metastatic endometrial cancer seen in a removed lung

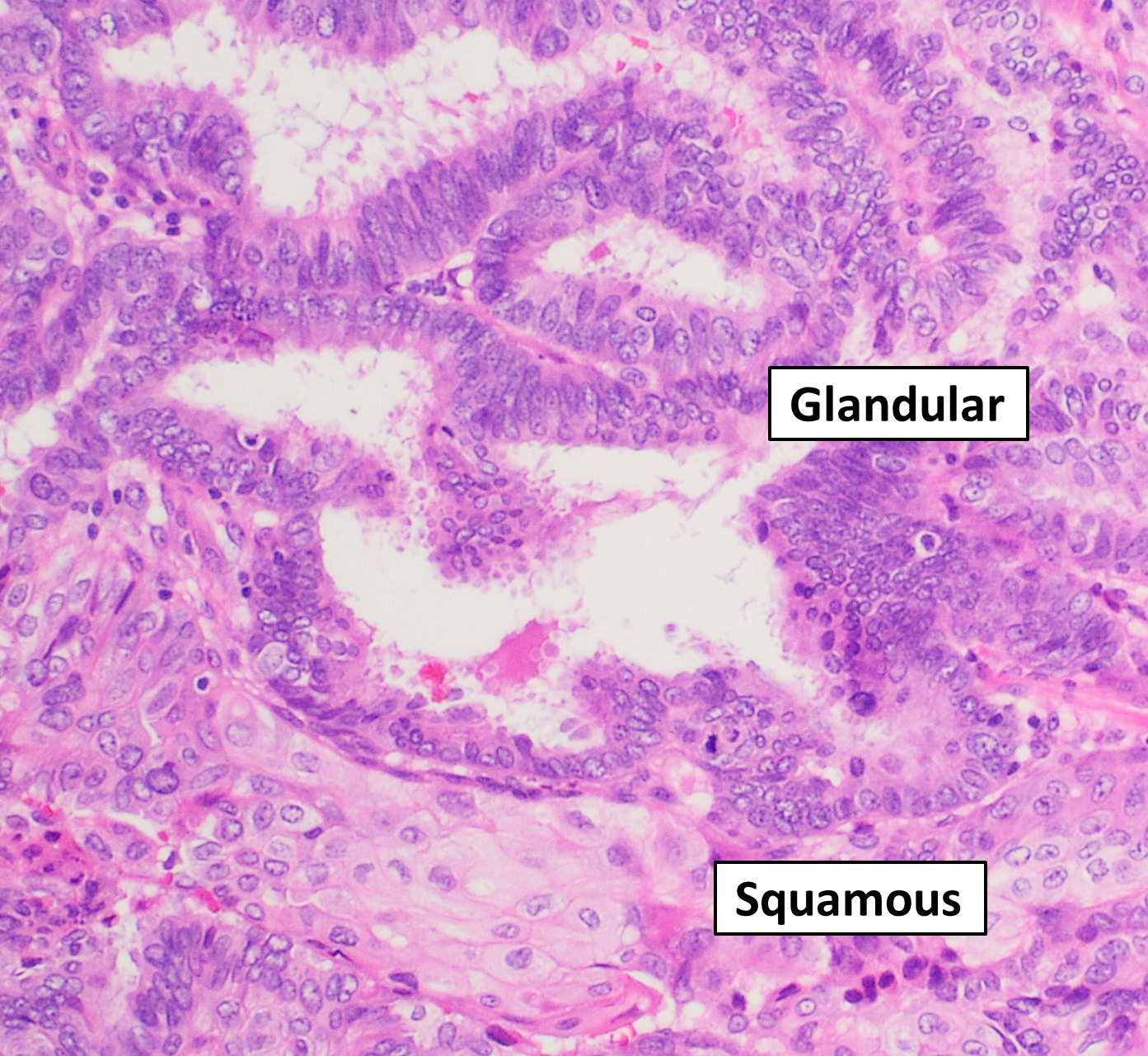
Grade 1: ≤5% solid non-glandular, non-squamous growth.

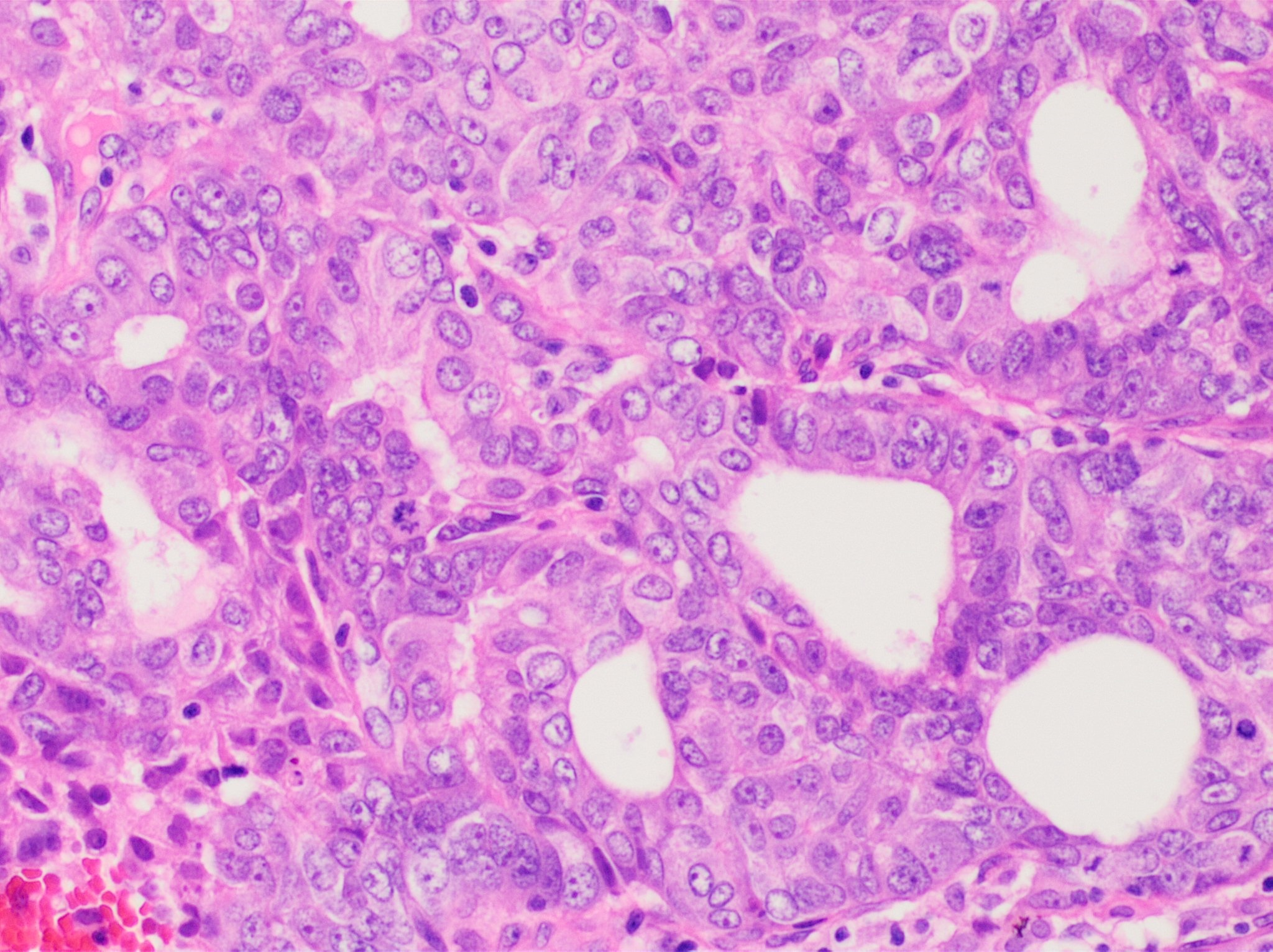
Grade 2: >5% and ≤50% solid non-glandular, non-squamous growth.

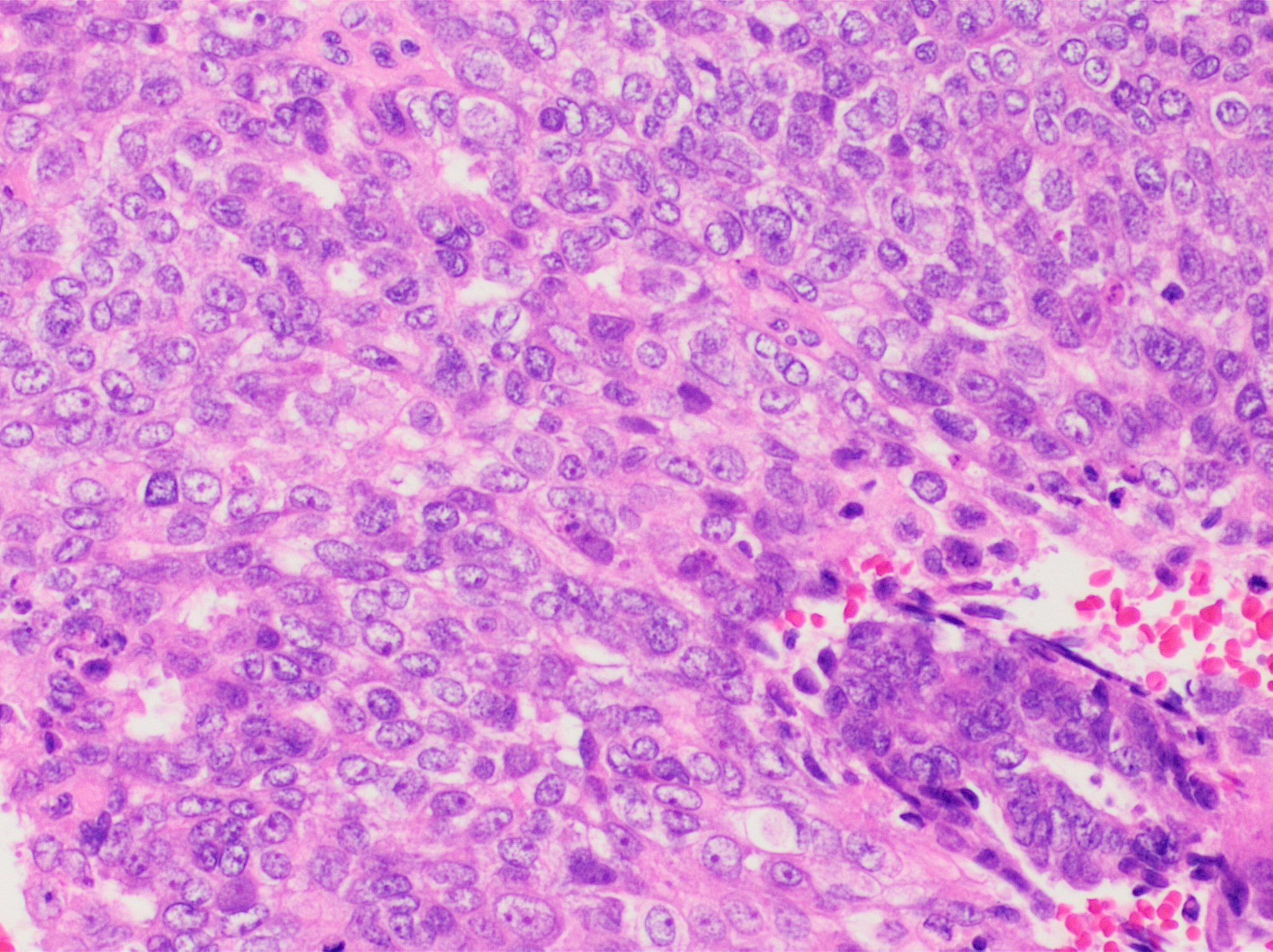
Grade 3: >50% solid non-glandular, non-squamous growth.

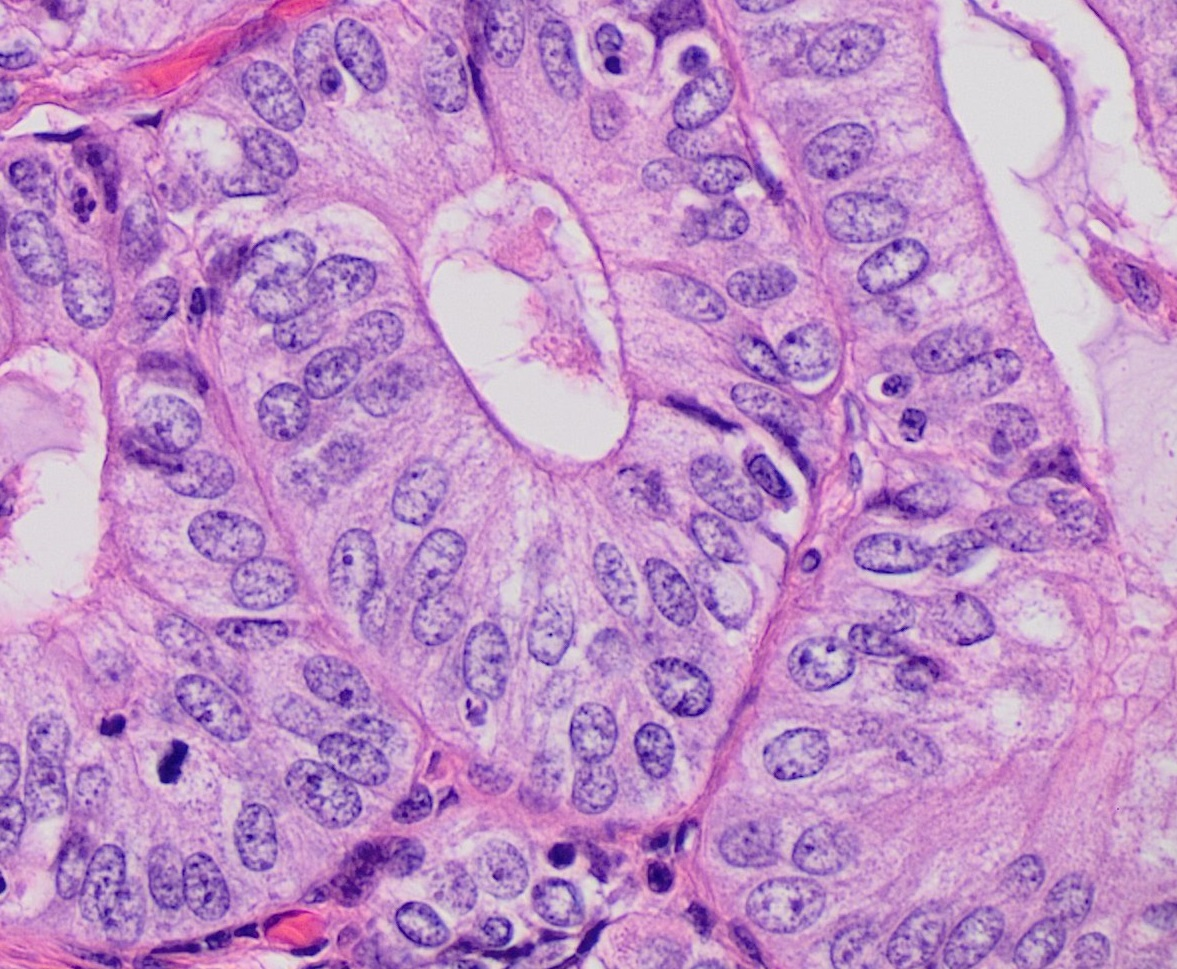
Nuclear grade 1: Oval, mildly enlarged nucleus with evenly distributed chromatin.

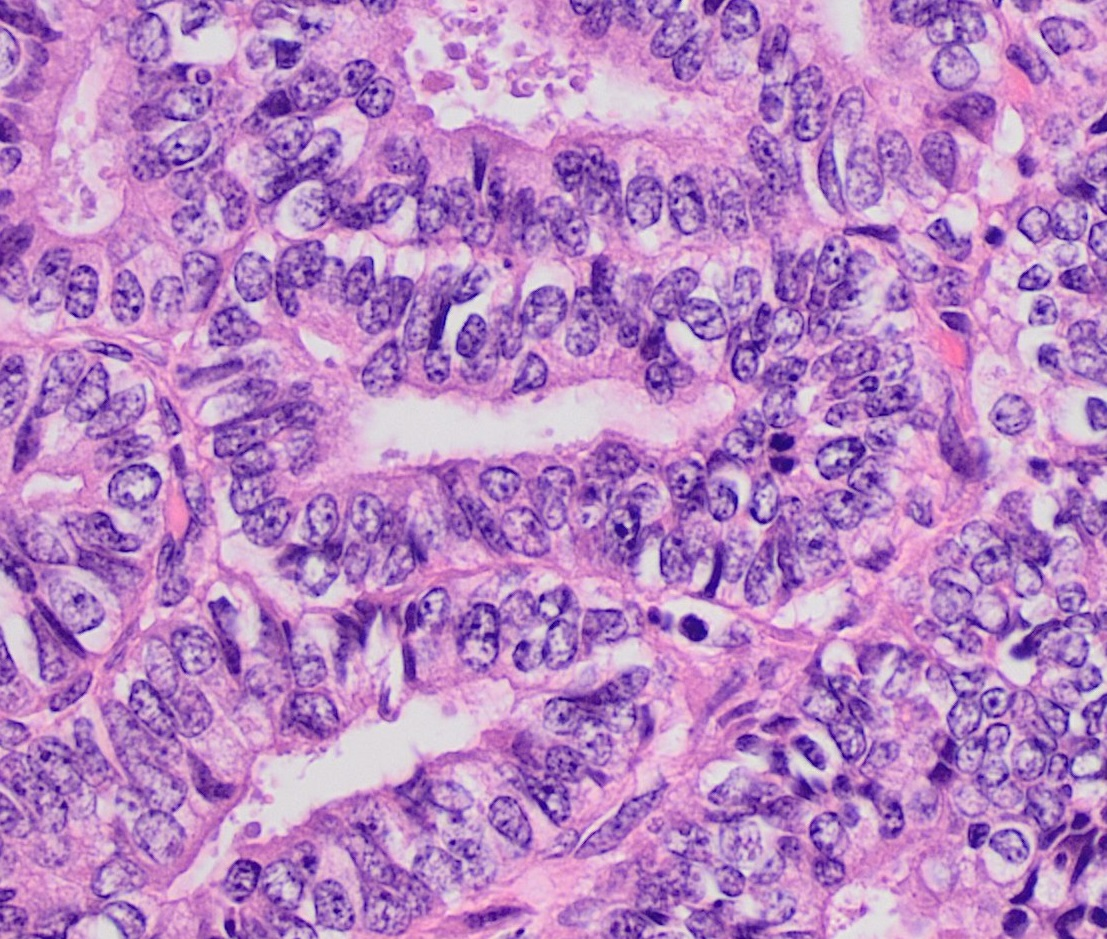
Nuclear grade 2: Intermediate features.

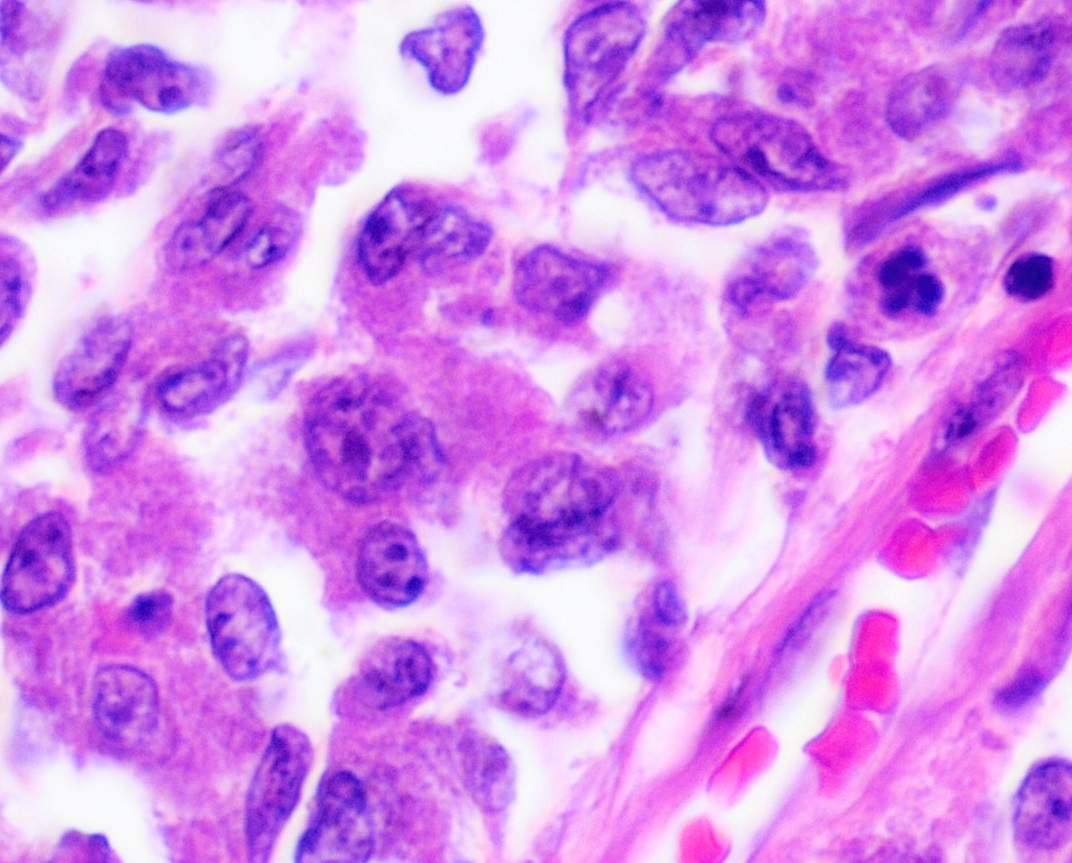
Nuclear grade 3: Markedly enlarged and pleomorphic nuclei, with coarse chromatin and distinct nucleoli.

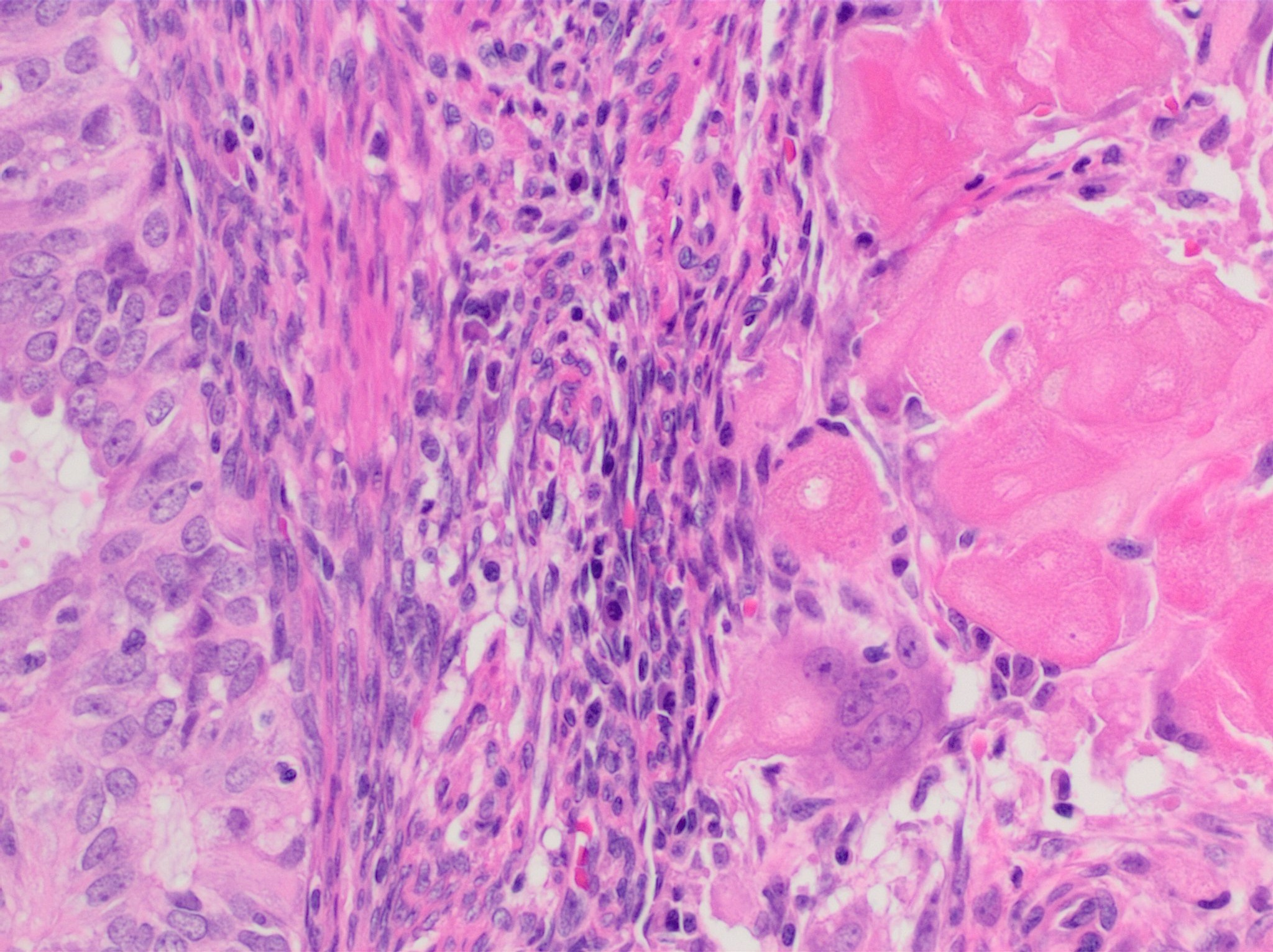
Squamous growth seen as necrotic "ghost cells" of keratinocytes at right in image, leaving pink keratin.

=== Staging ===
Endometrial carcinoma is surgically staged using the FIGO cancer staging system. The 2009 FIGO staging system is commonly used. There is an updated 2023 FIGO staging system, but it is not yet universally adopted. The 2009 FIGO staging system is as follows:

Stage	Description
IA	Tumor is confined to the uterus with less than half myometrial invasion
IB	Tumor is confined to the uterus with more than half myometrial invasion
II	Tumor involves the uterus and the cervical stroma
IIIA	Tumor invades serosa or adnexa
IIIB	Vaginal and/or parametrial involvement
IIIC1	Pelvic lymph node involvement
IIIC2	Para-aortic lymph node involvement, with or without pelvic node involvement
IVA	Tumor invades bladder mucosa and/or bowel mucosa
IVB	Distant metastases including abdominal metastases and/or inguinal lymph nodes

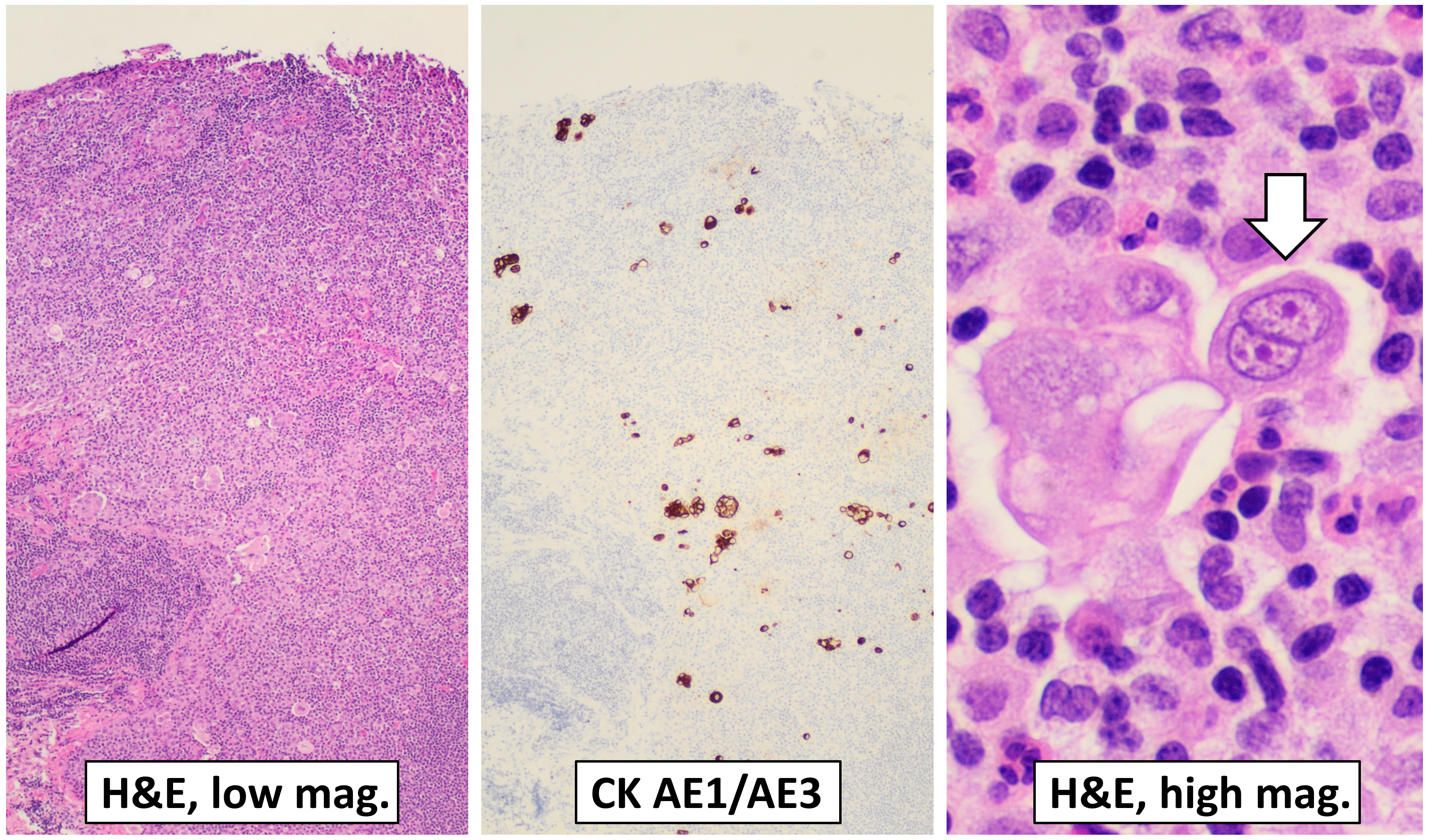
Histopathology of pelvic lymph node involvement in a patient with endometrial adenocarcinoma (FIGO grade 1): Left panel shows H&E staining and low magnification, where presence of small metastases is hard to see.; Middle panel shows immunohistochemistry for CK AE1/AE3, which highlights even small tumor nests.; The right panel shows high magnification on a positive area, confirming adenocarcinoma, as it shows tumor cells with large nuclei and prominent nucleoli.

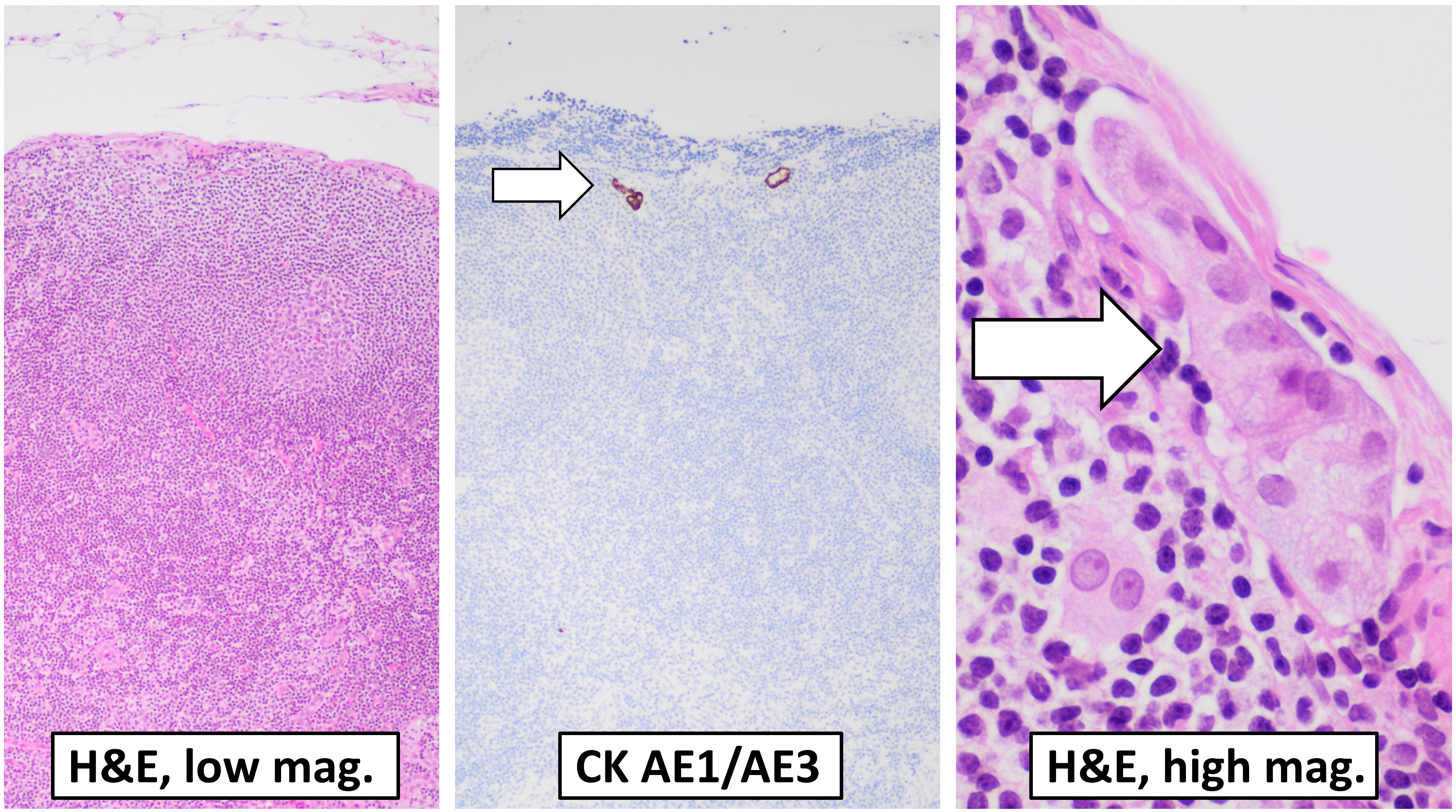
In contrast, isolated tumor cells do not count as lymph node metastasis. ITCs for endometrial cancers are defined as less than or equal to 0.2 mm or single cells or clusters of cells less than or equal to 200 cells in a single lymph node cross section.

Myometrial invasion and involvement of the pelvic and para-aortic lymph nodes are the most commonly seen patterns of spread. A Stage 0 is sometimes included; in this case, it is referred to as "carcinoma in situ". In 26% of presumably early-stage cancers, intraoperative staging revealed pelvic and distant metastases, making comprehensive surgical staging necessary.Sentinel lymph node biopsy (SLNB) has been incorporated into endometrial cancer staging guidelines as an alternative to systematic lymphadenectomy.

Stage IA and IB endometrial cancer

Stage II endometrial cancer

Stage III endometrial cancer

Stage IV endometrial cancer

== Management ==
Molecular classification of endometrial cancer, as recommended by ESGO-ESTRO-ESP guidelines, identifies four prognostic subgroups: POLE-mutated, mismatch repair deficients (dMMR), p-53 mutated, and no specific molecular profile (NSMP), each with distinct prognosis and treatment implications.

=== Surgery ===
A keyhole hysterectomy, one possible surgery to treat endometrial cancer

The initial treatment for endometrial cancer is surgery; 90% of women with endometrial cancer are treated with some form of surgery. Surgical treatment typically consists of hysterectomy including a bilateral salpingo-oophorectomy, which is the removal of the uterus, both ovaries, and the Fallopian tubes. Lymphadenectomy, or removal of pelvic and para-aortic lymph nodes, is performed for tumors of histologic grade II or above. Lymphadenectomy is routinely performed for all stages of endometrial cancer in the United States, but in the United Kingdom, the lymph nodes are typically only removed with disease of stage II or greater. The topic of lymphadenectomy and what survival benefit it offers in stage I disease is still being debated. In women with presumed stage I disease, a 2017 systematic review found no evidence that lymphadenectomy reduces the risk of death or relapse of cancer when compared with no lymphadenectomy. Women who undergo lymphadenectomy are more likely to experience systemic morbidity related to surgery or lymphoedema/lymphocyst formation. In stage III and IV cancers, cytoreductive surgery is the norm, and a biopsy of the omentum may also be included. In stage IV disease, where there are distant metastases, surgery can be used as part of palliative therapy. Laparotomy, an open-abdomen procedure, is the traditional surgical procedure; however, in those with presumed early stage primary endometrial cancer, laparoscopy (keyhole surgery) is associated with reduced operative morbidity and similar overall and disease free survival. Removal of the uterus via the abdomen is recommended over removal of the uterus via the vagina because it allows examining and obtaining washings of the abdominal cavity to detect any further evidence of cancer. Staging of the cancer is done during the surgery.

The few contraindications to surgery include inoperable tumor, massive obesity, a particularly high-risk operation, or a desire to preserve fertility. These contraindications happen in about 5–10% of cases. Women who wish to preserve their fertility and have low-grade stage I cancer can be treated with progestins, with or without concurrent tamoxifen therapy. This therapy can be continued until the cancer does not respond to treatment or until childbearing is done. Uterine perforation may occur during a D&C or an endometrial biopsy. Side effects of surgery to remove endometrial cancer can specifically include sexual dysfunction, temporary incontinence, and lymphedema, along with more common side effects of any surgery, including constipation.

=== Add-on therapy ===
There are many possible additional therapies. Surgery can be followed by radiation therapy and/or chemotherapy in cases of high-risk or high-grade cancers. This is called adjuvant therapy.

==== Chemotherapy ====
Adjuvant chemotherapy is a recent innovation, consisting of some combination of paclitaxel (or other taxanes like docetaxel), doxorubicin (and other anthracyclines), and platins (particularly cisplatin and carboplatin). Adjuvant chemotherapy has been found to increase survival in stage III and IV cancer more than added radiotherapy. Mutations in mismatch repair genes, like those found in Lynch syndrome, can lead to resistance against platins, meaning that chemotherapy with platins is ineffective in people with these mutations. Side effects of chemotherapy are common. These include hair loss, low neutrophil levels in the blood, and gastrointestinal problems.

In cases where surgery is not indicated, palliative chemotherapy is an option; higher-dose chemotherapy is associated with longer survival. Palliative chemotherapy, particularly using capecitabine and gemcitabine, is also often used to treat recurrent endometrial cancer.

Low-certainty evidence suggests that in women with recurrent endometrial cancer who have had chemotherapy, receiving drugs that inhibit the mTOR pathway may reduce the risk of disease worsening compared to having more chemotherapy or hormonal therapy. However, mTOR inhibitors may increase the chance of experiencing digestive tract ulcers.

==== Radiotherapy ====
Adjuvant radiotherapy is commonly used in early-stage (stage I or II) endometrial cancer. It can be delivered through vaginal brachytherapy (VBT), which is becoming the preferred route due to its reduced toxicity, or external beam radiotherapy (EBRT). Brachytherapy involves placing a radiation source in the organ affected; in the case of endometrial cancer a radiation source is placed directly in the vagina. External beam radiotherapy involves a beam of radiation aimed at the affected area from outside the body. VBT is used to treat any remaining cancer solely in the vagina, whereas EBRT can be used to treat remaining cancer elsewhere in the pelvis following surgery. However, the benefits of adjuvant radiotherapy are controversial. Though EBRT significantly reduces the rate of relapse in the pelvis, overall survival and metastasis rates are not improved. VBT provides a better quality of life than EBRT.

Radiotherapy can also be used before surgery in certain cases. When pre-operative imaging or clinical evaluation shows tumor invading the cervix, radiation can be given before a total hysterectomy is performed. Brachytherapy and EBRT can also be used, singly or in combination, when there is a contraindication for hysterectomy. Both delivery methods of radiotherapy are associated with side effects, particularly in the gastrointestinal tract.

==== Hormonal therapy ====
Hormonal therapy is only beneficial in certain types of endometrial cancer. It was once thought to be beneficial in most cases. If a tumor is well-differentiated and known to have progesterone and estrogen receptors, progestins may be used in treatment. There is no evidence to support the use of progestagen in addition to surgery for newly diagnosed endometrial cancer. About 25% of metastatic endometrioid cancers show a response to progestins. Also, endometrial stromal sarcomas can be treated with hormonal agents, including tamoxifen, hydroxyprogesterone caproate, letrozole, megestrol acetate, and medroxyprogesterone. This treatment is effective in endometrial stromal sarcomas because they typically have estrogen and/or progestin receptors. Progestin receptors function as tumor suppressors in endometrial cancer cells. Preliminary research and clinical trials have shown these treatments to have a high rate of response even in metastatic disease.

In 2010, hormonal therapy was of unclear effect in those with advanced or recurrent endometrial cancer. There is insufficient evidence to inform women considering hormone replacement therapy after treatment for endometrial cancer.

==== Targeted therapy ====
Dostarlimab has been approved by the FDA for therapy of endometrial cancer with specific biomarker

=== Monitoring ===
The tumor marker CA-125 is frequently elevated in endometrial cancer and can be used to monitor response to treatment, particularly in serous cell cancer or advanced disease. Periodic MRIs or CT scans may be recommended in advanced disease and women with a history of endometrial cancer should receive more frequent pelvic examinations for the five years following treatment. Examinations conducted every three to four months are recommended for the first two years following treatment, and every six months for the next three years.

Women with endometrial cancer should not have routine surveillance imaging to monitor the cancer unless new symptoms appear or tumor markers begin rising. Imaging without these indications is discouraged because it is unlikely to detect a recurrence or improve survival and because it has its costs and side effects. If a recurrence is suspected, PET/CT scanning is recommended.

== Prognosis ==
=== Survival rates ===
5-year relative survival rates in the US by FIGO stage:
Stage	5-year survival rate
I-A	88%
I-B	75%
II	69%
III-A	58%
III-B	50%
III-C	47%
IV-A	17%
IV-B	15%

The five-year survival rate for endometrial adenocarcinoma following appropriate treatment is 80%. More than 70% of women diagnosed have FIGO stage I cancer, which has the best prognosis. Stage III and especially Stage IV cancers have a worse prognosis, but these are relatively rare, occurring in only 13% of cases. The median survival time for stage III–IV endometrial cancer is nine to ten months. Older age indicates a worse prognosis. In the United States, white women have a higher survival rate than black women, who tend to develop more aggressive forms of the disease by the time of their diagnosis. Tumors with high progesterone receptor expression have a good prognosis compared to tumors with low progesterone receptor expression; 93% of women with high progesterone receptor disease survived to three years, compared with 36% of women with low progesterone receptor disease. Heart disease is the most common cause of death among those who survive endometrial cancer, with other obesity-related health problems also being common. Following diagnosis, quality of life is also positively associated with a healthy lifestyle (no obesity, high-quality diet, physical activity).

=== Recurrence rates ===
Recurrence of early-stage endometrial cancer ranges from 3% to 17%, depending on primary and adjuvant treatment. Most recurrences (75–80%) occur outside of the pelvis, and most occur within two to three years of treatment—64% within two years and 87% within three years.

Higher-staged cancers are more likely to recur, as are those that have invaded the myometrium or cervix or that have metastasized into the lymphatic system. Papillary serous carcinoma, clear cell carcinoma, and endometrioid carcinoma are the subtypes at the highest risk of recurrence. High-grade histological subtypes are also at elevated risk for recurrence.

The most common site of recurrence is in the vagina; vaginal relapses of endometrial cancer have the best prognosis. If relapse occurs from a cancer that has not been treated with radiation, EBRT is the first-line treatment and is often successful. If a cancer treated with radiation recurs, pelvic exenteration is the only option for curative treatment. Palliative chemotherapy, cytoreductive surgery, and radiation are also performed. Radiation therapy (VBT and EBRT) for a local vaginal recurrence has a 50% five-year survival rate. Pelvic recurrences are treated with surgery and radiation, and abdominal recurrences are treated with radiation and, if possible, chemotherapy. Other common recurrence sites are the pelvic lymph nodes, para-aortic lymph nodes, peritoneum (28% of recurrences), and lungs, though recurrences can also occur in the brain (<1%), liver (7%), adrenal glands (1%), bones (4–7%; typically the axial skeleton), lymph nodes outside the abdomen (0.4–1%), spleen, and muscle/soft tissue (2–6%).

== Epidemiology ==
As of 2014, approximately 320,000 women are diagnosed with endometrial cancer worldwide each year and 76,000 die, making it the sixth most common cancer in women. It is more common in developed countries, where the lifetime risk of endometrial cancer in women is 1.6%, compared to 0.6% in developing countries. It occurs in 12.9 out of 100,000 women annually in developed countries.

In the United States, endometrial cancer is the most frequently diagnosed gynecologic cancer and, in women, the fourth most common cancer overall, representing 6% of all cancer cases in women. In that country, as of 2014 it was estimated that 52,630 women were diagnosed yearly and 8,590 would die from the disease. Northern Europe, Eastern Europe, and North America have the highest rates of endometrial cancer, whereas Africa and West Asia have the lowest rates. Asia saw 41% of the world's endometrial cancer diagnoses in 2012, whereas Northern Europe, Eastern Europe, and North America together comprised 48% of diagnoses. Unlike most cancers, the number of new cases has risen in recent years, including an increase of over 40% in the United Kingdom between 1993 and 2013. Some of this rise may be due to the increase in obesity rates in developed countries, increasing life expectancies, and lower birth rates. The average lifetime risk for endometrial cancer is approximately 2–3% in people with uteruses. In the UK, approximately 7,400 cases are diagnosed annually, and in the EU, approximately 88,000.

Endometrial cancer appears most frequently during perimenopause (the period just before, just after, and during menopause), between the ages of 50 and 65; overall, 75% of endometrial cancer occurs after menopause. Women younger than 40 make up 5% of endometrial cancer cases and 10–15% of cases occur in women under 50 years of age. This age group is at risk for developing ovarian cancer at the same time. The worldwide median age of diagnosis is 63 years of age; in the United States, the average age of diagnosis is 60 years of age. White American women are at higher risk for endometrial cancer than black American women, with a 2.88% and 1.69% lifetime risk, respectively. Japanese-American women and American Latina women have lower rates, and Native Hawaiian women have higher rates.

== Research ==
There are several experimental therapies for endometrial cancer under research, including immunologic, hormonal, and chemotherapeutic treatments. Trastuzumab (Herceptin), an antibody against the Her2 protein, has been used in cancers known to be positive for the Her2/neu oncogene, but research is still underway. Immunologic therapies are also under investigation, particularly in uterine papillary serous carcinoma.

Cancers can be analyzed using genetic techniques (including DNA sequencing and immunohistochemistry) to determine if certain therapies specific to mutated genes can be used to treat it. PARP inhibitors are used to treat endometrial cancer with PTEN mutations, specifically, mutations that lower the expression of PTEN. The PARP inhibitor shown to be active against endometrial cancer is olaparib. Research has been ongoing in this area as of the 2010s.

Research is ongoing on the use of metformin, a diabetes medication, in obese women with endometrial cancer before surgery. Early research has shown it to be effective in slowing the rate of cancer cell proliferation. Preliminary research has shown that preoperative metformin administration can reduce the expression of tumor markers. Long-term use of metformin has not been shown to have a preventative effect against developing cancer, but it may improve overall survival.

Temsirolimus, an mTOR inhibitor, is under investigation as a potential treatment. Research shows that mTOR inhibitors may be particularly effective for cancers with mutations in PTEN. Ridaforolimus (deforolimus) is also being researched as a treatment for people who have previously had chemotherapy. Preliminary research has been promising, and a stage II trial for ridaforolimus was completed by 2013. There has also been research on combined ridaforolimus/progestin treatments for recurrent endometrial cancer. Bevacizumab and tyrosine kinase inhibitors, which inhibit angiogenesis, are being researched as potential treatments for endometrial cancers with high levels of vascular endothelial growth factor. Ixabepilone is being researched as a possible chemotherapy for advanced or recurrent endometrial cancer. Treatments for rare high-grade undifferentiated endometrial sarcoma are being researched, as there is no established standard of care yet for this disease. Chemotherapies being researched include doxorubicin and ifosfamide.

There is also research in progress on more genes and biomarkers that may be linked to endometrial cancer. The protective effect of combined oral contraceptives and the IUD is being investigated. Preliminary research has shown that the levonorgestrel IUD placed for a year, combined with six monthly injections of gonadotropin-releasing hormone, can stop or reverse the progress of endometrial cancer in young women, specifically complex atypical hyperplasia; however, the results have been inconclusive. An experimental drug that combines a hormone with doxorubicin is also under investigation for greater efficacy in cancers with hormone receptors. Hormone therapy that is effective in treating breast cancer, including the use of aromatase inhibitors, is also being investigated for use in endometrial cancer. One such drug is anastrozole, which is currently being researched in hormone-positive recurrences after chemotherapy. Research into hormonal treatments for endometrial stromal sarcomas is ongoing as well. It includes trials of drugs like mifepristone, a progestin antagonist, and aminoglutethimide and letrozole, two aromatase inhibitors.

Research continues into the best imaging method for detecting and staging endometrial cancer. As current diagnostic methods are invasive and inaccurate, researchers are looking into new ways to catch endometrial cancer, especially in its early stages. A study found that using a technique involving infrared light on simple blood test samples detected uterine cancer with high accuracy (87%) and could detect precancerous growths in all cases. In surgery, research has shown that complete pelvic lymphadenectomy along with hysterectomy in stage 1 endometrial cancer does not improve survival and increases the risk of negative side effects, including lymphedema. Other research is exploring the potential of identifying the sentinel lymph nodes for biopsy by injecting the tumor with dye that shines under infrared light. Intensity modulated radiation therapy is currently under investigation and already used in some centers for application in endometrial cancer to reduce side effects from traditional radiotherapy. Its risk of recurrence has not yet been quantified. Research on hyperbaric oxygen therapy to reduce side effects is also ongoing. The results of the PORTEC 3 trial assessing combining adjuvant radiotherapy with chemotherapy were awaited in late 2014.

There is not enough evidence to determine if people with endometrial cancer benefit from additional behavioural and lifestyle interventions that are aimed at losing excess weight.

== History and culture ==
Endometrial cancer is not widely known by the general populace despite its frequency. There is low awareness of the symptoms, which can lead to later diagnosis and worse survival.
