= Clear cell =

Cell type in histology

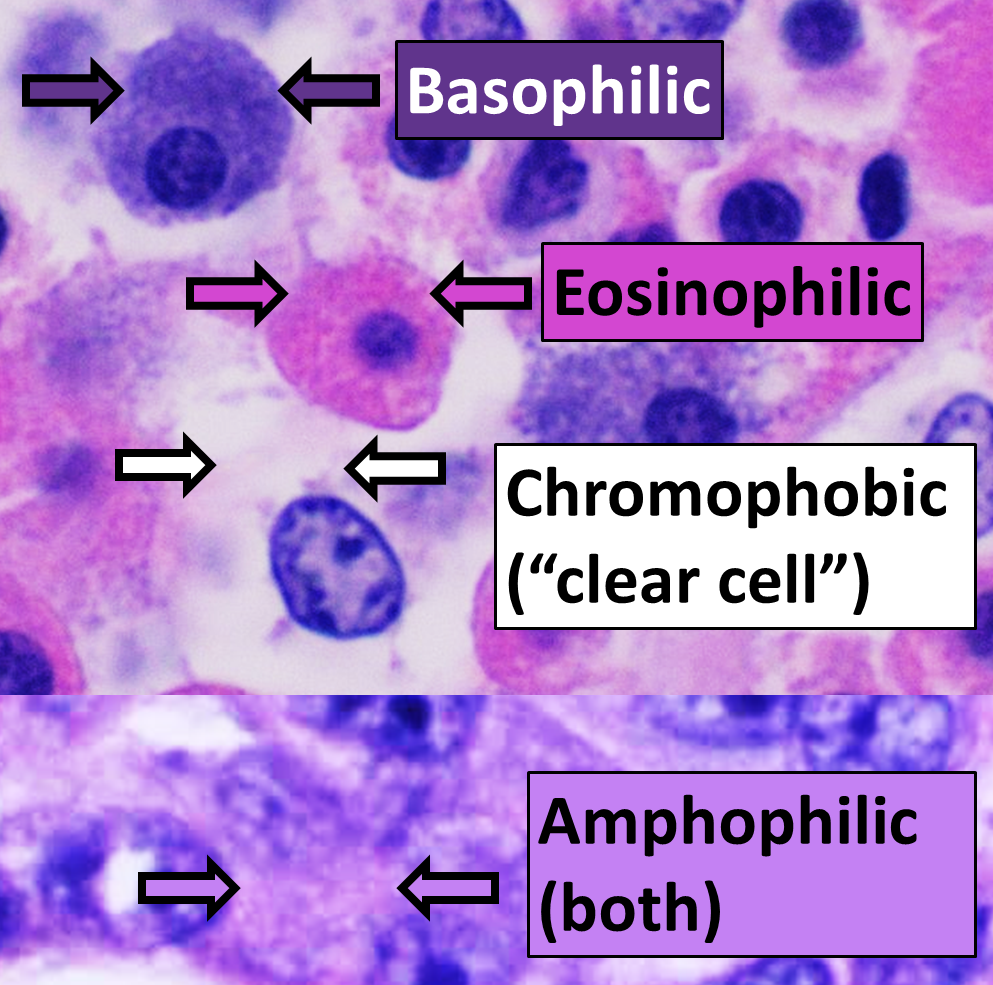
Staining types when using hematoxylin and eosin (H&E).

In histology, a clear cell is a cell that shows a clear cytoplasm when stained with hematoxylin and eosin (H&E).

== Normal histology ==
In the skin, some secretory cells in the epithelium appear as clear cells, and are one of the components of eccrine sweat glands. A clear cell's plasma membrane is highly folded, more so on the apical and lateral surfaces. The cytoplasm of clear cells contains large amounts of glycogen and many mitochondria. Melanocytes appear as clear cells when in the stratum basale of the skin, and Langerhans' cells appear as clear cells in the stratum spinosum.

C cells, more commonly referred to as parafollicular cells are type of cell found in the thyroid gland which stain clear using H&E.

== Clear cell cancers ==
The clear appearance is often due to the accumulation of substances like glycogen, lipids, or mucin within the cells. This can be a sign of high metabolic activity, which is common in cancer cells as they rapidly grow and divide. Neoplastic clear cells can originate from a variety of sources, including, but not limited to, epithelial cells, adipose cells, and chondrocytes. Some of these malignant clear cell tumors are listed below.

- Clear cell squamous cell carcinoma of the skin.
- Clear cell carcinoma of the ovary, endometrium, and cervix.
- Clear cell renal cell carcinoma, clear cell papillary renal cell carcinoma.
- Clear cell hepatocellular carcinoma.
- Clear cell carcinoma of the salivary gland, clear cell myoepithelial carcinoma.
- Clear cell meningioma, clear cell ependymoma.
