= Endometrial hyperplasia =

- Micrograph showing simple endometrial hyperplasia, where the gland-to-stroma ratio is preserved but the glands have an irregular shape and/or are dilated. Endometrial biopsy. H&E stain.
- Specialty: Gynaecology

Endometrial hyperplasia is a condition of excessive proliferation of the cells of the endometrium, which is the inner lining of the uterus. It is classified into two categories based on the presence of atypia, which means cells with abnormal appearances. Abnormal uterine bleeding is the most common symptom.

Most cases of endometrial hyperplasia result from high levels of estrogens, combined with insufficient levels of the progesterone-like hormones which ordinarily counteract estrogen's proliferative effects on this tissue. This may occur in several settings, including obesity, polyendocrine metabolic ovarian syndrome (PMOS), estrogen-secreting ovarian tumors, and certain formulations of estrogen replacement therapy. Incidence peaks during the perimenopausal period in the fifth and sixth decades of life.

Diagnosis depends on histological examination of endometrial tissue. Treatment focuses on progestin therapy when atypia is absent and hysterectomy when atypia is present. Prognosis also depends heavily on the presence of atypia. Atypical endometrial hyperplasia is a significant risk factor for the development or even co-existence of endometrial cancer, so careful monitoring and treatment of women with this disorder are essential.

== Classification ==
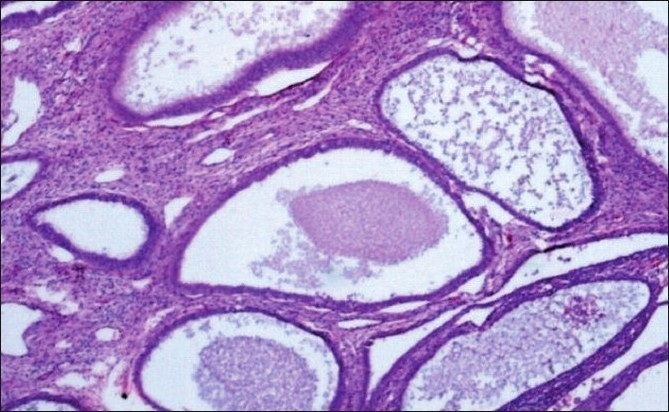
Histopathology of complex hyperplasia without atypia: Cystically dilated endometrial glands lined by a single layer of columnar epithelium.

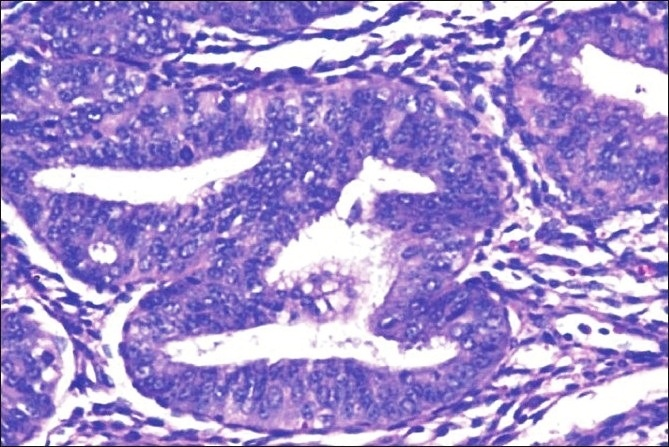
Histopathology of complex hyperplasia with atypia: Closely packed endometrial glands with sparse intervening stroma and stratification of the lining epithelium. Epithelial cells show cytological atypia.

The most commonly used classification system for endometrial hyperplasia is the World Health Organization (WHO) system, which divides the condition into two categories with different therapeutic and prognostic implications:

1. Endometrial hyperplasia without atypia
  - Irregular, dilated glands without worrisome changes in the appearance of individual gland cells.
2. Atypical endometrial hyperplasia (AEH) or endometrial intraepithelial neoplasia (EIN)
  - Crowded, irregular glands with architectural abnormalities and worrisome changes in individual gland cells. These changes are similar to those seen in cancer cells, but atypical hyperplasia does not show invasion into surrounding tissue, a defining characteristic of cancer.

Like other hyperplastic disorders, endometrial hyperplasia initially represents a physiological response of endometrial tissue to the growth-promoting actions of estrogen. However, the gland-forming cells of a hyperplastic endometrium may also undergo changes over time which predispose them to cancerous transformation.

== Symptoms ==
Abnormal uterine bleeding

- heavy, prolonged, or irregular menstrual bleeding (including bleeding between periods) in premenopausal women
- postmenopausal bleeding in women after menopause

Asymptomatic in some individuals

== Risk factors ==
Risk factors mainly revolve around high estrogen without adequate opposition from progesterone.

Hormonal and metabolic factors

- Obesity
- Chronic anovulation, including polyendocrine metabolic ovarian syndrome (PMOS) and perimenopause (especially in the fifth and sixth decades of life)
- Diabetes mellitus
- Metabolic syndrome
- Estrogen-secreting ovarian tumors, including granulosa cell tumors

Medication-related factors

- Estrogen-only hormone replacement therapy
- Tamoxifen

Reproductive factors

- Nulliparity (never having given birth)
- Late menopause
- Early menarche

There is no population-wide endometrial screening, but selective screening for high-risk individuals may be appropriate at the discretion of healthcare professionals.

== Diagnosis ==
Endometrial hyperplasia is diagnosed through histological examination of endometrial tissue, which can be obtained by office-based endometrial biopsy or dilation and curettage (D&C). The American College of Obstetricians and Gynecologists (ACOG) specifically recommends that the biopsy be performed using hysteroscopy, which provides direct visualization inside the uterus to allow better sampling, while the Royal College of Obstetricians and Gynaecologists (RCOG) and the Society of Obstetricians and Gynaecologists (SOGC) recommend office-based sampling as the initial test, considering its convenience. Although histological examination is the definitive method for diagnosing endometrial hyperplasia, transvaginal ultrasound is usually the initial test for patients with suggestive symptoms and measures endometrial thickness. An endometrial thickness over 4 mm in a woman with postmenopausal bleeding would prompt endometrial biopsy.

In premenopausal women, transvaginal ultrasound may be less reliable because normal fluctuations of endometrial thickness throughout the menstrual cycle may overlap with the cutoff thickness of endometrial hyperplasia. However, transvaginal ultrasound should be considered for premenopausal women with polyendocrine metabolic ovarian syndrome (PMOS) and abnormal uterine bleeding or absent withdrawal bleeds.

In patients diagnosed with atypical endometrial hyperplasia, endometrial cancer may already be present in about 30-50% of cases. This failure to detect an existing cancer is likely a result of insufficient tissue obtained in the biopsy and the difficulty in distinguishing between atypical hyperplasia and low-grade cancer histologically. So, if a patient is diagnosed with atypical endometrial hyperplasia and does not wish to remove their uterus, they should undergo hysteroscopy with endometrial sampling to evaluate for concurrent endometrial cancer.

== Prognosis ==
Atypia is a major factor that influences prognosis, particularly the potential for cancer, as well as treatment decisions.

=== Endometrial hyperplasia without atypia ===
Without hysterectomy, endometrial hyperplasia can turn into endometrial cancer in:

- less than 5% of cases within 20 years.

=== Atypical endometrial hyperplasia ===
Without hysterectomy, endometrial hyperplasia can turn into endometrial cancer in:

- 28% of cases within 20 years.
- about 8% per year.

If treated with progestins without hysterectomy:

- 66% of cases achieved complete resolution.
- 23% had recurrence, with a median time of about 24 months.

== Treatment ==
=== Endometrial hyperplasia without atypia ===
Most cases resolve on their own, so observation with follow-up biopsies is appropriate. But using progestin would provide a greater chance at full recovery and should be used instead of observation alone if there is abnormal uterine bleeding. Continuous oral progestins and levonorgestrel-releasing intrauterine devices (LNG-IUDs) are both acceptable options, but the LNG-IUD is generally preferred because it is more effective with potentially reduced need for hysterectomy, better treatment adherence, and fewer systemic adverse effects. Regardless of which progestin is chosen, treatment should be continued for at least six months, with the LNG-IUD potentially remaining in place for up to five years. The RCOG recommends the biopsies to be done every six months until two consecutive negative results are obtained. In addition, patients should be encouraged to make lifestyle modifications such as weight reduction and blood glucose control.

=== Atypical endometrial hyperplasia ===
Total hysterectomy is recommended as the definitive treatment by multiple clinical guidelines. Endometrial ablation, on the other hand, often cannot resolve the condition completely and can make future testing difficult. If the patient is premenopausal, the decision to remove the ovaries should consider individual preference. If the patient decides to preserve their uterus, they should be informed of the risk of concurrent endometrial cancer and be started on progestin therapy with options including LNG-IUDs, oral progestins, and combined progestin therapy. Just like endometrial hyperplasia without atypia, LNG-IUD is usually preferred over oral progestin. For oral progestin, continuous therapy is generally preferred over cyclical therapy.

If the patient chooses progestin rather than hysterectomy, they should undergo repeat endometrial biopsy within 3-6 months after starting the treatment. The RCOG recommends the timing to be every 3 months until two consecutive negative results are obtained, after which the interval can be extended to every 6-12 months until hysterectomy is done. Follow-up visits with regular endometrial sampling are crucial for detecting possible progression and recurrence of the condition.

== See also ==
- Endometrial intraepithelial neoplasia
- Endometrial carcinoma
- Hyperplasia
