= List of diseases (O) =

This is a list of diseases starting with the letter "O".

== O–Ob ==
- O'Donnell-Pappas syndrome
- Obesophobia (pocrescophobia)
- Obsessive–compulsive disorder (OCD)
- Obsessive–compulsive personality disorder
- Obstructive sleep apnea

== Oc ==
=== Occ–Och ===
- Occipital horn syndrome
- Occult spinal dysraphism
- Occupational asthma
- Ochoa syndrome (Urofacial syndrome)
- Ochronosis
- Ockelbo disease (Pogosta disease, Karelian fever, Sindbis fever)

=== Ocu ===
- Ocular albinism
- Ocular histoplasmosis
- Ocular melanoma
- Ocular motility disorders
- Ocular toxoplasmosis
- Oculoauriculofrontonasal syndrome
- Oculo-auriculo-vertebral spectrum (Goldenhar syndrome)
- Oculocerebral hypopigmentation syndrome Cross type
- Oculocerebral hypopigmentation syndrome (Preus type)
- Oculocerebral syndrome with hypopigmentation (Cross syndrome)
- Oculo-cerebro-acral syndrome
- Oculocerebrocutaneous syndrome (Delleman-Oorthuys syndrome)
- Oculocerebrorenal syndrome of Lowe
- Oculocutaneous albinism
  - Type I
  - Type II
  - Type III
  - Type IV
- Oculocutaneous tyrosinemia (Tyrosinemia Type II)
- Oculodentodigital dysplasia
- Oculodigitoesophagoduodenal syndrome (Feingold syndrome)
- Oculofaciocardiodental syndrome
- Oculogastrointestinal muscular dystrophy
- Oculomaxillofacial dysostosis
- Oculomaxillofacial dysplasia
- Oculomotor nerve palsy
- Oculopalatoskeletal syndrome (Michels syndrome)
- Oculopharyngeal muscular dystrophy

== Od–Ok ==
- Odonto-onycho-dermal dysplasia
- Odontoma
- Odonto-onycho-dermal dysplasia
- Odontophobia
- Odontotrichomelic hypohidrotic dysplasia
- OEIS complex (omphalocele-exstrophy-imperforate anus-spinal defects)
- Ogilvie's syndrome
- OHANA syndrome
- Ohdo syndrome
- Ohtahara syndrome
- Okamoto syndrome

== Ol ==
- Oligodactyly
- Oligomeganephronia
- Oliver–McFarlane syndrome
- Olivopontocerebellar atrophy (symptom of Multiple system atrophy)
- Ollier disease
- Olmsted syndrome

== Om–On ==
- Omenn syndrome
- Omodysplasia
  - Type 1 (autosomal recessive)
  - Type 2 (autosomal dominant)
- Omsk hemorrhagic fever
- Onat syndrome
- Onchocerciasis (River blindness)
- Oncocytoma
- Ondine's curse (Failure of automatic ventilation; central hypoventilation syndrome; sleep apnea)
- Onychocryptosis (Ingrown toenail)
- Onychogryphosis
- Onycholysis
- Onychomadesis
- Onychomatricoma
- Onychomycosis
- Onychophosis

== Op ==
=== Opi-Ops ===
- Opioid-induced hyperalgesia
- Opioid use disorder
- Ophthalmo-acromelic syndrome of Waardenburg
- Ophthalmomandibulomelic dysplasia
- Opitz-Frias syndrome (G syndrome)
- Opitz–Mollica–Sorge syndrome
- Opitz–Reynolds–Fitzgerald syndrome
- Opportunistic infections
- Oppositional defiant disorder
- Opsismodysplasia

=== Opt ===
- Optic disc drusen
- Optic nerve disorders
  - Optic nerve glioma
  - Optic nerve hypoplasia
  - Optic disc coloboma
  - Optic neuritis
  - Optic neuropathy

== Or ==
=== Ora–Orn ===
- Oral-facial cleft
- Oral-facial-digital syndromes
  - Oral facial digital syndrome type 1 (Papillon-Leage-Psaume Syndrome)
  - Oral facial digital syndrome type 2 (Mohr syndrome)
  - Oral facial digital syndrome type 3 (Sugarman syndrome)
  - Oral facial digital syndrome type 4 (Mohr-Majewski syndrome, Baraitser-Burn syndrome)
  - Oral facial digital syndrome type 5 (Thurston syndrome)
  - Oral facial digital syndrome type 6 (Varadi–Papp syndrome)
  - Oral facial digital syndrome type 7 (Whelan syndrome)
  - Oral facial digital syndrome type 8 (Edwards syndrome)
  - Oral facial digital syndrome type 9 (Gurrieri syndrome)
  - Oral facial digital syndrome type 10 (Figuera syndrome)
  - Oral facial digital syndrome type 11 (Gabrielli syndrome)
  - Oral facial digital syndrome type 12 (Moran-Barroso syndrome)
  - Oral facial digital syndrome type 13 (Degner syndrome)
- Oral leukoplakia
- Oral submucous fibrosis
- Organic brain syndromes
- Organic personality disorder
- Organophosphate poisoning
- Ornithine aminotransferase deficiency
- Ornithine transcarbamylase deficiency
- Ornithosis (Psittacosis, Avian Chlamydiosis)

=== Oro–Ort ===
- Oroacral syndrome (Verloes-Koulischer-Oro-Acral syndrome)
- Orofacial digital syndrome (OFDs)
- Oropharyngeal dysphagia
- Orotic aciduria
- Ostravik–Lindemann–Solberg syndrome
- Orthostatic intolerance

== Os ==
=== Ose–Oss ===
- Osebold–Remondini syndrome
- Osgood–Schlatter disease

=== Ost ===
- Osteitis deformans (Paget's disease of bone)
- Osteoarthritis
- Osteoarthropathy
- Osteoarthrosis
- Osteochondritis dissecans
- Osteochondrodysplasia
- Osteochondroma
- Osteocraniostenosis
- Osteodysplasia
  - Anderson type
  - Sclerotic osteodysplasia
  - Osteodysplastic primordial dwarfism
- Osteoectasia (Juvenile Paget's disease)
- Osteogenesis imperfecta
- Osteoglophonic dysplasia (Osteoglophonic dwarfism)
- Osteolysis
- Osteomalacia
- Osteomyelitis
- Osteonecrosis
- Osteopathia condensans disseminata
- Osteopathia striata
  - Osteopathia striata with cranial sclerosis
  - Osteopathia striata with hyperpigmented dermopathy
- Osteopetrosis
- Osteopoikilosis
- Osteoporosis
- Osteosarcoma
  - Osteosarcoma limb anomalies erythroid macrocytosis (OSLAM syndrome)
- Osteosclerosis
  - Worth syndrome (Mandibular osteosclerosis, autosomal dominant osteosclerosis)
  - Van Buchem disease
- Ostertag type, familial amyloidosis

== Ot–Ox ==
- Otopalatodigital syndromes
  - Type I
  - Type II
  - Frontometaphyseal dysplasia
  - Melnick–Needles syndrome
- Otodental syndrome
- Otofaciocervical syndrome
- Oto-onycho-peroneal syndrome
- Oto-palato-digital syndrome
- Otosclerosis
- Oto-spondylo-megaepiphyseal dysplasia (OSMED)
- Ouvrier–Billson syndrome (Paroxysmal tonic upgaze of childhood)
- Ovarian cancer
  - Ovarian carcinosarcoma
- Ovarian remnant syndrome
- Overgrowth syndromes
  - Beckwith–Wiedemann syndrome
  - Simpson–Golabi–Behmel syndrome
  - Sotos syndrome
  - Weaver syndrome
- Overwhelming post-splenectomy infection (OPSI)
- Oxalosis (Hyperoxaluria)
