= Ovarian disease =

- Specialty: Gynecology

Ovarian diseases are diseases or disorders of the ovary. They can be classified as endocrine disorders or as disorders of the reproductive system.

If the egg fails to release from the follicle in the ovary an ovarian cyst may form. Small ovarian cysts are common in healthy women. Some women have more follicles than usual (polyendocrine metabolic ovarian syndrome), which inhibits the follicles to grow normally and this will cause cycle irregularities.

== Types ==
Other types of ovarian diseases listed in table include endometriosis, ovarian tumors, ovarian cancer, and ovarian germ cell tumors.

	Notes	Ref(s)
Ovarian tumors		
Germ cell tumor	Seen most often in young women or adolescent girls. Other germ cell tumors are: Endodermal sinus tumor and teratoma,	
Ovarian cancer	includes ovarian epithelial cancer	
Luteoma	Seen in pregnancy	
Ovaritis	Synonym of oophoritis	
Ovarian remnant syndrome	Incomplete removal of tissue during oophorectomy	
Endometriosis	Often seen in a variety of reproductive regions, including the ovaries.	
Hypogonadism	It exists in two forms, central and primary. Central hypogonadism is a condition that is a result of improper function of the hypothalamus and pituitary gland.	
Hyperthecosis	Theca cells are present within ovarian stroma	
Ovarian torsion	Occurs in rare cases. Can occur in all ages	
Ovarian apoplexy (rupture)	Most often results from ovarian cysts. In rare instances, this condition can cause hemorrhaging and death.	
Premature ovarian failure	This disorder is linked to genetic, environmental, and autoimmune conditions	
Polyendocrine metabolic ovarian syndrome (PMOS)	Affects women of reproductive age	
Anovulation	Caused by a variety of conditions	
Follicular cyst of ovary	Can occur after menopause, or during childbearing years	
Theca lutein cyst	Normally occurs postpartum	
Ovarian germ cell tumors	Benign	
Dysgerminoma	Typically occurs in young women between the ages of 10 and 30 years of age	
Choriocarcinoma	Can occur without gynecological symptoms	
Yolk sac tumor	Malignant. Occurs in young children	
Teratoma	Very rare. Often occurs in newborns	
Ovarian serous cystadenoma	Benign lesions	
Serous cystadenocarcinoma	Malignant. Low survival rates	
Mucinous cystadenocarcinoma	Rare and malignant	
Brenner tumor	This benign tumor is often found in post-menopausal women	
Granulosa cell tumor	Rare. Increases estrogen levels.	
Krukenberg tumor	Metastatic with origins from the stomach	

== More commonly found ==
=== Endometriosis ===
Endometriosis is a condition in which tissues lining the uterus (endometrial stroma and gland) grows abnormally beyond the uterus that may become quite painful. In simpler terms, it means that the tissue lining the uterus develops in different parts outside of it. It can be either at ovary, fallopian tubes, or peritoneal spaces. There is no single cause.

Symptoms include menstrual cramps, heavy menstrual bleeding, bowel or urinary problems, nausea, vomiting, blood with stools, painful intercourse, fatigue, spotting or bleeding between periods.

Treatment may incorporate a healthier lifestyle, hormonal birth control, or surgery in extreme situations.

=== Ovarian cysts ===
It is common for many women to develop a cyst in their lifetime. At times, these can go unnoticed without pain or visible symptoms. A cyst may develop in either of the ovaries that are responsible for producing hormones and carrying eggs. Ovarian cysts can be of various types, such as dermoid cysts, endometrioma cysts, and the functional cyst.

Symptoms:

1. Abdominal bloating or swelling.
2. Painful bowel movement.
3. Pelvic pain before or after the menstrual cycle.
4. Painful intercourse.
5. Pain in the lower back or thighs.
6. Breast tenderness.
7. Nausea and vomiting.
8. Fever.
9. Rapid breathing.
10. Faintness or dizziness.
11. Sharp pelvic pain.

Treatment:

1. Taking of oral contraceptives or birth control pills as prescribed by the doctor.
2. Laparoscopy: Surgery to remove the cyst.
3. Hysterectomy in case the cyst is cancerous.

=== Ovarian epithelial cancer ===
It is one of the common ovarian cancers that affect women worldwide. It develops outside the ovaries and ultimately spreads outside and can affect other organs.

Causes:

It may happen if there is a family medical history of breast cancer, colon cancer, rectal cancer or uterine cancer, or Lynch syndrome. If someone is under Estrogen Replacement Therapy for a long time. Smoking habits may also lead to the same.

Treatment:

1. Surgery to remove the uterus.
2. Chemotherapy.

=== Ovarian germ cell tumors ===
Ovarian germ cell tumors are common among teenagers and young women.

Causes:

Though the exact causes are not known, it may happen owing to certain birth defects affecting the genitals, nervous system or the urinary tract. There may be genetic conditions affecting the sex chromosomes that result in this kind of tumors as well.

Symptoms

1. Belly swelling.
2. Pain or pressure in the belly.
3. Swollen abdomen.
4. Vaginal bleeding after menopause.

Treatment:

1. Surgery to remove the tumor, or the Fallopian tubes or one or more ovaries.
2. Hysterectomy.
3. Chemotherapy in case the tumor is cancerous.
4. Radiation therapy to prevent the cancerous cells from developing.

=== Ovarian low malignant potential tumors ===
The tumor forms in the ovaries and gradually spreads to the outside of ovary. This mostly affects younger women and also hinders the reproductive system.

Causes:

Causes are debatable and these may occur to both pregnant women and women who do not opt for pregnancy

Symptoms:

1. Abdominal pain or swelling.
2. Bowel problems or constipation.

Treatment:

Depending on the size of the tumor, choice of pregnancy, the spreading of the tumor, age and choices, removing the affected ovary is the most common treatment. In rare situations, the tumor is taken out of the ovary. Also, hysterectomy can be an option.

=== Polyendocrine metabolic ovarian syndrome ===
This is a hormonal imbalance, where androgens (also called male hormones) are elevated.

The increased level of androgens may result in irregular menstrual cycle and diabetes and heart problem in the long run. It also affects the body in various ways like problem getting pregnant, sleep apnea, depression and anxiety, can enhance the risk of endometrial cancer.

Symptoms:

1. Irregular periods.
2. Heavy bleeding during periods.
3. Excess hair growth on face and other parts of the body like chest, back, belly.
4. Acne.
5. Weight gain.
6. Darkening of skin.
7. Headaches.

Treatment:

1. Oral contraceptives to promote regular periods
2. Healthier lifestyle.
