= Orofaciodigital syndrome =

- Other names: Orofaciodigital syndrome
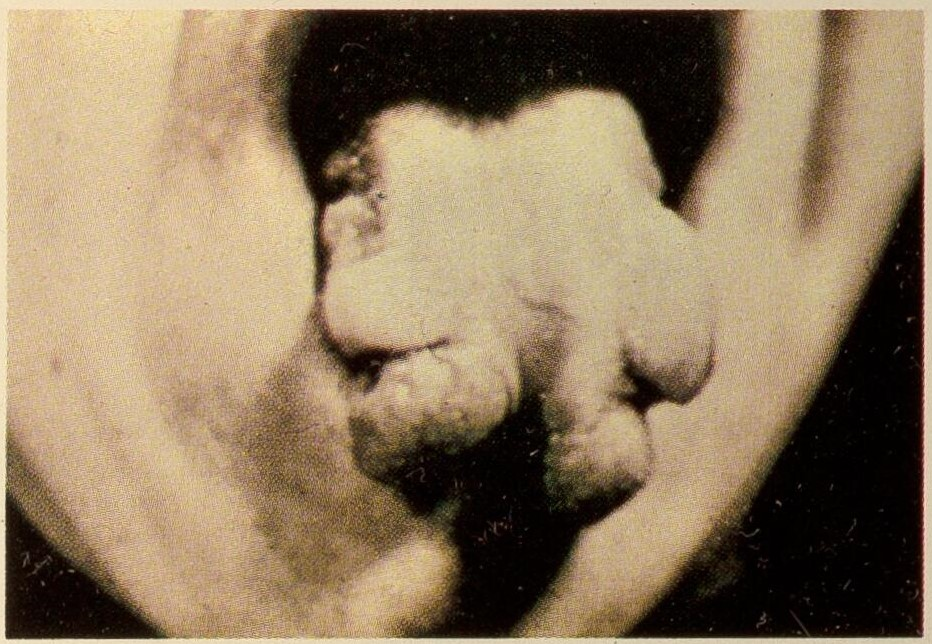
- Tongue in orofaciodigital syndrome
- Specialty: Rheumatology, medical genetics

Orofaciodigital syndrome or oral-facial-digital syndrome is a group of at least 13 related conditions that affect the development of the mouth, facial features, and digits in between 1 in 50,000 to 250,000 newborns with the majority of cases being type I (Papillon-League-Psaume syndrome).

== Type ==
The different types are:s

- Type I, Papillon-League-Psaume syndrome
- Type II, Mohr syndrome
- Type III, Sugarman syndrome
- Type IV, Baraitser-Burn syndrome
- Type V, Thurston syndrome
- Type VI, Varadi-Papp syndrome
- Type VII, Whelan syndrome
- Type VIII, Oral-facial-digital syndrome, Edwards type (not to be confused with Edwards syndrome)
- Type IX, OFD syndrome with retinal abnormalities
- Type X, OFD with fibular aplasia
- Type XI, Gabrielli syndrome
