= Taybi syndrome =

Taybi syndrome may refer to:

- Oto-palato-digital syndrome, formerly known as Taybi syndrome
- Rubinstein–Taybi syndrome, a syndrome characterized by unusual facial traits and broad thumbs and toes.
- Taybi–Linder syndrome, also known as cephaloskeletal dysplasia
