= Cross syndrome =

- Other names: Oculocerebral hypopigmentation syndrome, Cross type
- Cross syndrome is inherited in an autosomal recessive manner
- Specialty: Endocrinology
- Frequency: 0.0001%

Cross syndrome (also known as Cross–McKusick–Breen syndrome, hypopigmentation and microphthalmia, and oculocerebral-hypopigmentation syndrome) is an extremely rare disorder characterized by white skin, blond hair with yellow-gray metallic sheen, small eyes with cloudy corneas, jerky nystagmus, gingival fibromatosis and severe intellectual disability and physical retardation.

It was characterized in 1967.

== See also ==
- Oculocerebrocutaneous syndrome
- List of cutaneous conditions
