= Serous cystadenocarcinoma =

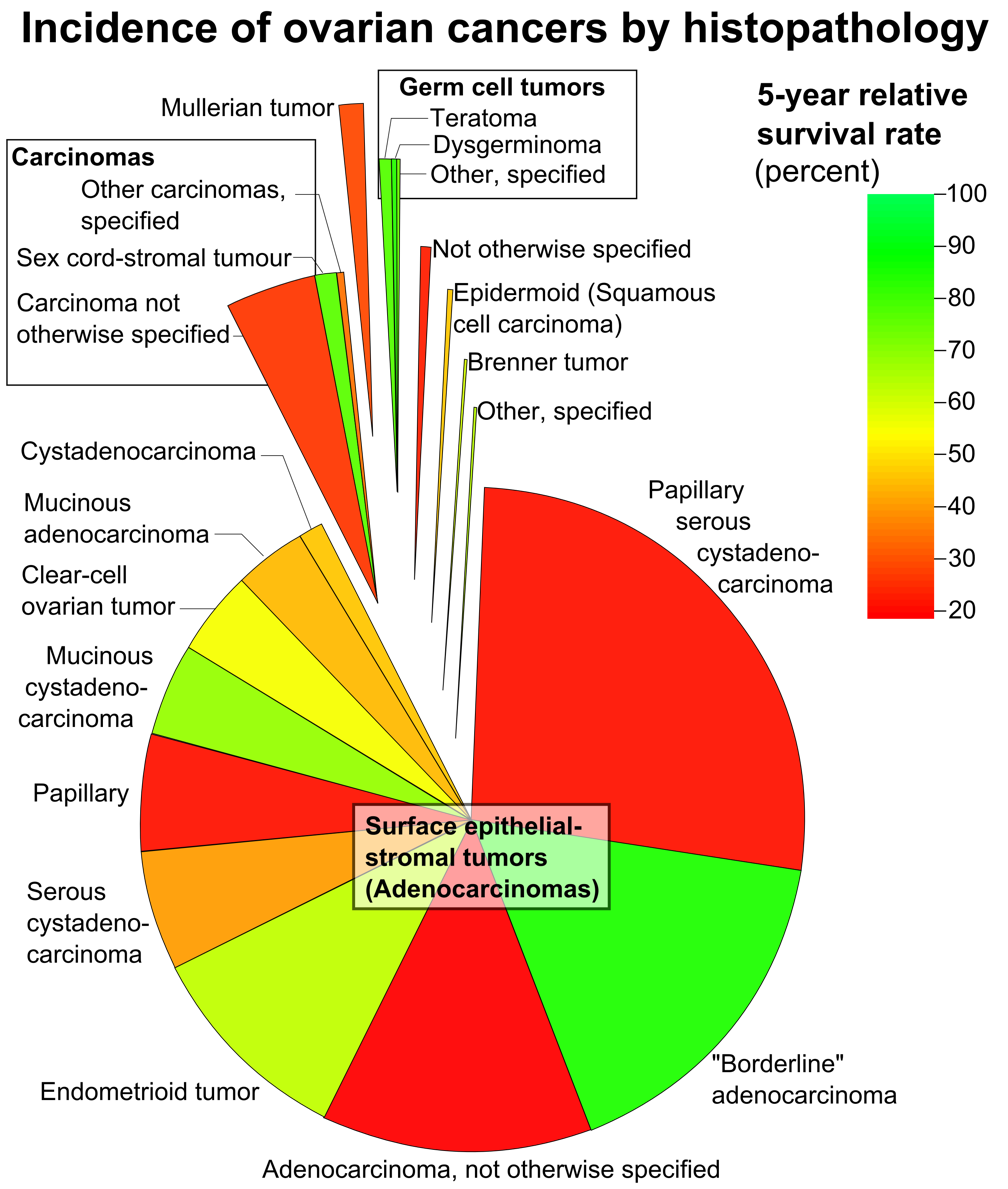
- Ovarian cancers in women aged 20+, with area representing relative incidence and color representing 5-year relative survival rate. Serous cystadenocarcinoma is labeled at bottom left.
- Specialty: Oncology

Serous cystadenocarcinoma is a serous tumor in the cystadenocarcinoma grouping.

Most commonly, the primary site of serous cystadenocarcinoma is the ovary. Rare occurrence in the pancreas has been reported, although this is not typical, with the majority of microcystic pancreatic masses representing alternate disease processes such as the more benign serous cystadenoma.
