= OFD1 =

Mammalian protein found in Homo sapiens

Identifiers
- Aliases: OFD1, 71-7A, CXorf5, JBTS10, RP23, SGBS2, oral-facial-digital syndrome 1, centriole and centriolar satellite protein, OFD1 centriole and centriolar satellite protein
- External IDs: OMIM: 300170; MGI: 1350328; GeneCards: OFD1

Gene location (Human)
Chr.	X chromosome (human)
Band	Xp22.2	Start	13,734,743 bp
Band	Xp22.2	End	13,777,955 bp

Gene location (Mouse)
Chr.	X chromosome (mouse)
Band	X F5|X 77.28 cM	Start	165,173,029 bp
Band	X F5|X 77.28 cM	End	165,223,700 bp
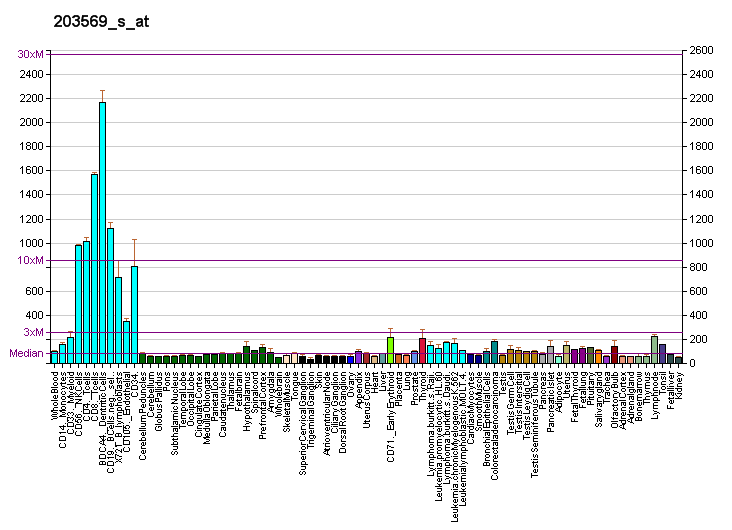
RNA expression pattern
Bgee	Human / Mouse (ortholog); Top expressed in: sperm; bronchial epithelial cell; right uterine tube; olfactory zone of nasal mucosa; optic nerve; parotid gland; tendon of biceps brachii; endometrium; left lobe of thyroid gland; left ovary / Top expressed in: primary oocyte; zygote; secondary oocyte; fossa; otic vesicle; saccule; motor neuron; condyle; substantia nigra; tail of embryo; More reference expression data
BioGPS	More reference expression data
Gene ontology
Molecular function	alpha-tubulin binding; protein binding; identical protein binding; gamma-tubulin binding
Cellular component	cytoplasm; ciliary basal body; cytosol; centrosome; cell projection; membrane; cilium; centriolar satellite; microtubule organizing center; centriole; cytoskeleton; nucleus; extracellular region
Biological process	epithelial cilium movement involved in determination of left/right asymmetry; mitotic spindle assembly; cell projection organization; G2/M transition of mitotic cell cycle; centriole replication; cilium assembly; ciliary basal body-plasma membrane docking; mitotic cell cycle; regulation of G2/M transition of mitotic cell cycle
Sources:Amigo / QuickGO
Orthologs
Databases	NCBI: entry; OMA: entry
Species	Human	Mouse
Entrez	8481	237222
Ensembl	ENSG00000046651	ENSMUSG00000040586
UniProt	O75665	Q80Z25
RefSeq (mRNA)	NM_003611; NM_001330209; NM_001330210	NM_177429
RefSeq (protein)	NP_001317138; NP_001317139; NP_003602	NP_803178
Location (UCSC)	Chr X: 13.73 – 13.78 Mb	Chr X: 165.17 – 165.22 Mb
PubMed search
- Wikidata
View/Edit Human	View/Edit Mouse

Oral-facial-digital syndrome 1 protein is a protein that in humans is encoded by the OFD1 gene.

Human chromosomal region Xp22.3-p21.3 comprises the area between the pseudoautosomal boundary and the Duchenne muscular dystrophy gene (MIM 300377). This region harbors several disease loci, including OFD1 (MIM 311200), CFNS (MIM 304110), DFN6 (MIM 300066), and SEDT (MIM 313400). It also contains a region of homology with both the short and the long arms of the Y chromosome and undergoes frequent chromosomal rearrangements.[supplied by OMIM]

== See also ==
- Orofaciodigital syndrome 1
- Simpson–Golabi–Behmel syndrome
