= Mucinous cystadenocarcinoma =

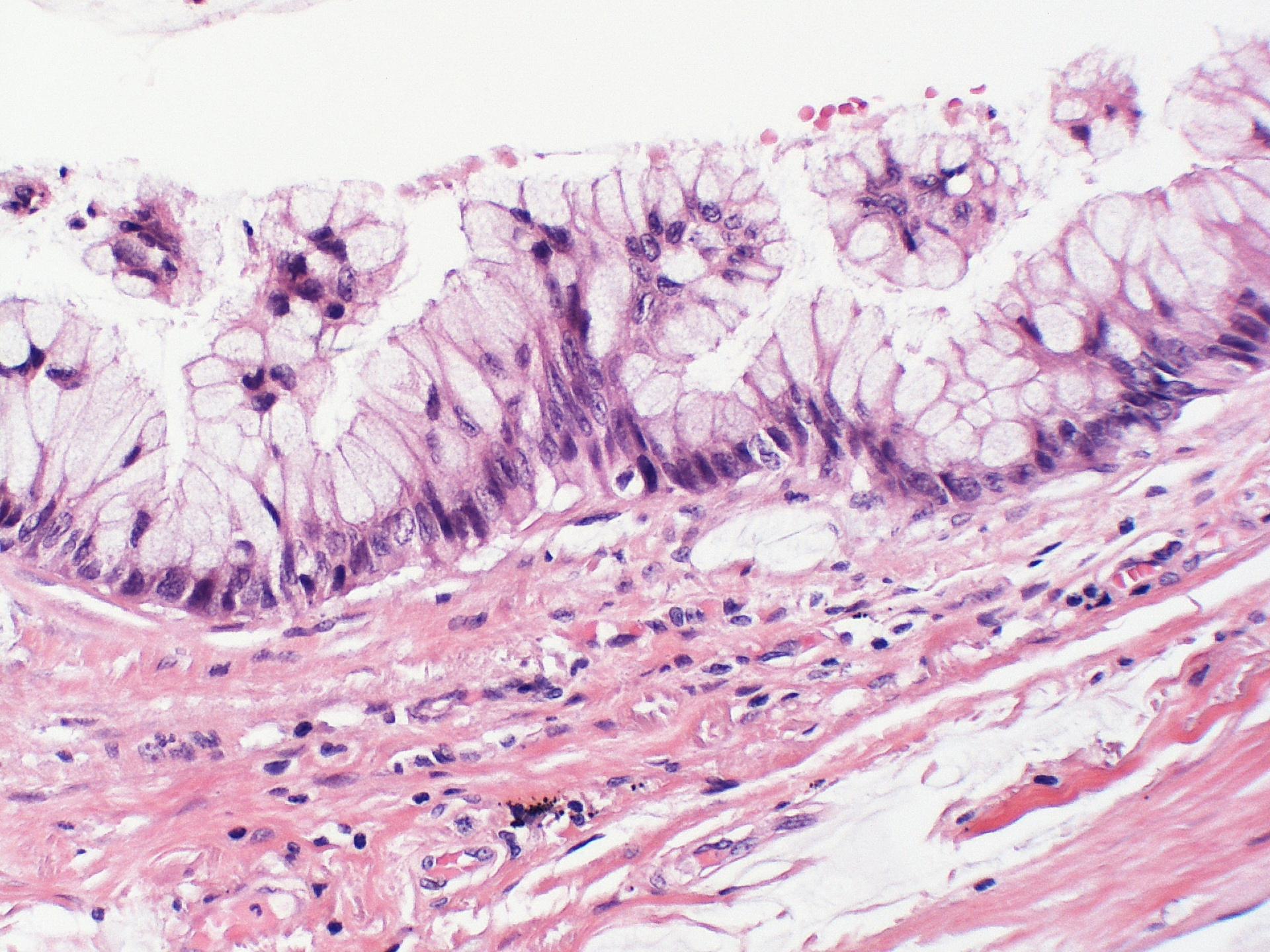
- Atypical goblet cells with focal tufting. The classification of these rare neoplasms is difficult and controversial. There appears to be a spectrum of mucinous cystic tumors ranging from those that are obviously benign (benign epithelium and no tumor invasion into surrounding lung) to those that exhibit invasion into surrounding lung tissue and are, therefore, malignant. In between is a group of neoplasms that exhibit epithelial atypia but no tumor invasion into lung tissue and the malignant potential of these is uncertain. This case appears to fall into that category. Focal cyst rupture with extravasation of mucin into surrounding lung tissue may occur with all types of mucinous cystic tumors.
- Specialty: Oncology

Mucinous cystadenocarcinoma is a type of tumor in the cystadenocarcinoma grouping.

It can occur in the breast as well as in the ovary. Tumors are normally multilocular with various smooth, thin walled cysts. Within the cysts is found a haemorrhagic or cellular debris.
