= Familial osteodysplasia, Anderson type =

- Specialty: Medical genetics
- Types: It is a type of osteodysplasia, and it doesn't have any subtypes itself.
- Prevention: None
- Prognosis: Good
- Frequency: very rare, only 6 cases have been reported in medical literature.

Familial osteodysplasia, Anderson type is a rare genetic disorder which is characterized by cranio-facial dysmorphisms and multiple skeletal anomalies. Hyperuricemia, hypertension and high erythrocyte sedimentation rates have also been reported. Approximately 6 cases have been reported in medical literature. This disorder is thought to be inherited in an autosomal recessive manner.

== Description ==
People with this disorder often show the following symptoms:

=== Craniofacial ===
- Underdevelopment of midface
- Flat, broad nasal bridge
- Thin, prognathic mandible
- Pointy chin
- Malocclusion
- Underdeveloped teeth

=== Skeletal ===
- Scoliosis
- Thinning of the calvaria
- Pointy spinous processes
- Clinodactyly
- Phalangeal dysplasia

Additional symptoms include hyperuricemia, high erythrocyte sedimentation rates and hypertension.

== Etymology ==
This condition was first discovered in 1972 by L G Anderson et al. and J S Buchignani et al. They described the case of five siblings and their dad; four out of the five siblings had recurrent mandibular fractures and cranio-facial dysmorphisms, such as prominent earlobes. These four siblings also had hyperuricemia and three out of those four siblings had hypertension. Their father had hyperuricemia and hypertension but was otherwise unaffected. The siblings were the result of consanguineous Irish parents.
