= Ostravik–Lindemann–Solberg syndrome =

Ostravil–Lindemann–Solberg syndrome
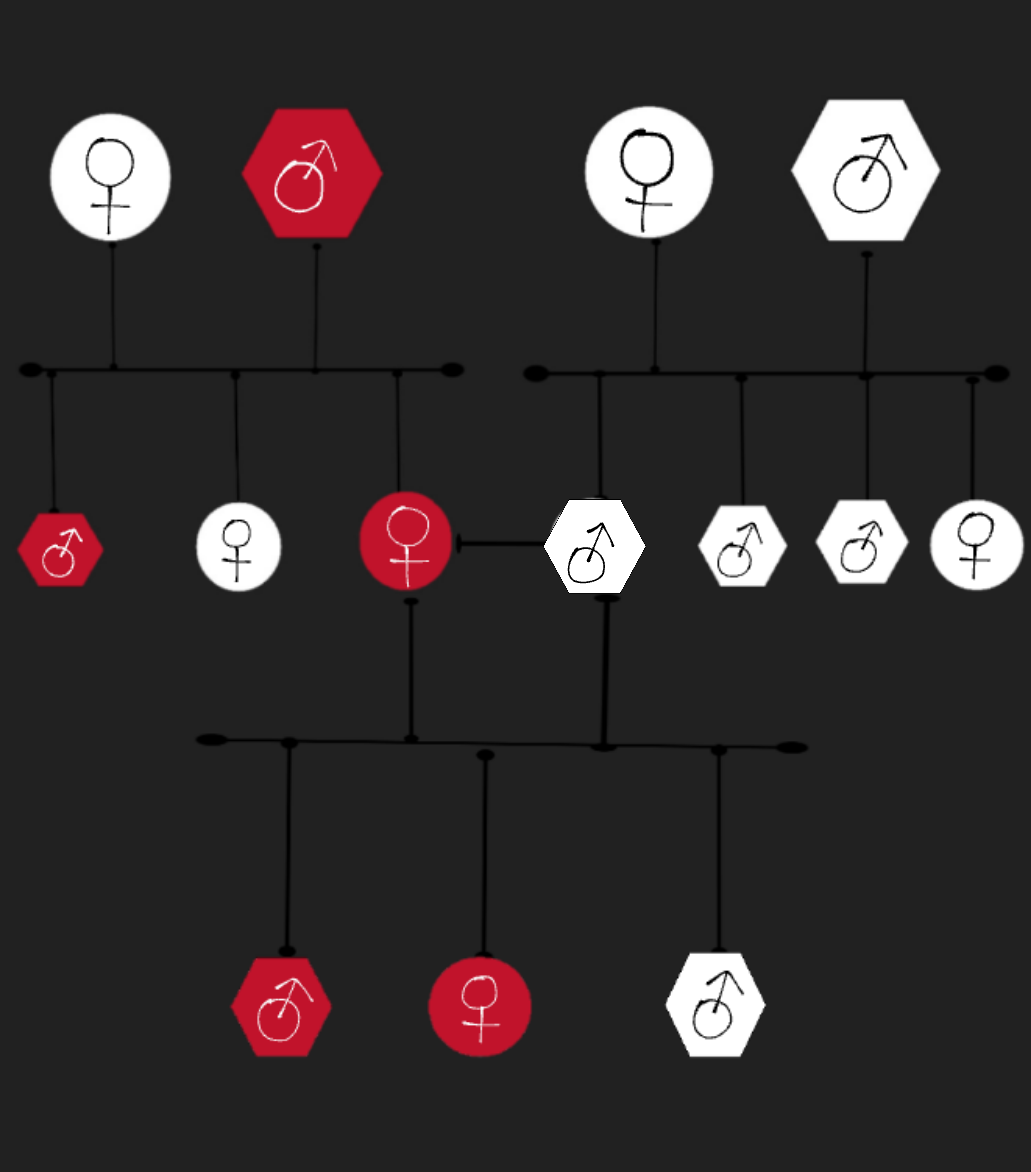
- Specialty: Medical genetics
- Symptoms: congenital heart defects, polysyndactyly, and tongue hamartomas.
- Complications: death
- Usual onset: birth
- Duration: life-long
- Causes: Genetic mutation
- Diagnostic method: Genetic testing
- Prevention: none
- Frequency: very rare, only 5 cases have been reported

Ostravik–Lindemann–Solberg syndrome, also known as heart defect-tongue hamartoma-polysyndactyly syndrome, is a rare, multi-systemic genetic disorder which is characterized by congenital heart defects, tongue hamartomas, postaxial polydactyly of the hand, and syndactylism of the foot. This condition is thought to be caused by an autosomal dominant mutation in the WDPCP gene, in chromosome 2. Only five cases have been recorded in medical literature.
