= Oliver–McFarlane syndrome =

Condition causing eyebrow hairgrowth

- Other names: Trichomegaly-retina pigmentary degeneration-dwarfism syndrome
- This condition is inherited in an autosomal recessive manner.
- Specialty: Medical genetics

Oliver–McFarlane syndrome is a condition characterized by hypertrichosis of the eyebrows and eyelashes.

== See also ==
- Ollier disease
- List of cutaneous conditions
