= Omodysplasia 2 =

- Omodysplasia 2 is inherited in an autosomal dominant manner.

Omodysplasia type 2 is a very rare genetic disorder characterised by abnormalities in the skull, long bones and genitourinary system.

== Clinical features ==
These can be grouped under those evident in the skull/face, the long bones and the genitourinary system

- Skull
  - Anteverted nostrils
  - Bifid nasal tip
  - Depressed nasal bridge
  - Fontal bossing
  - Long philtrum
  - Low set ears
- Long bones
  - Short first metacarpal
  - Short humerus
- Genitourinary
  - Genitourinary hypoplasia

== Genetics ==
This condition is inherited in an autosomal dominant fashion.

Mutations in the Frizzled Class Receptor 2 (FZD2) gene have been associated with this condition.

== Diagnosis ==
=== Differential diagnosis ===
Robinow syndrome

== Treatment ==
There is no currently known treatment for this condition.

== History ==
This condition was first described by Maroteaux et al in 1989.
