= Melnick–Needles syndrome =

X-linked dominant disorder that affects primarily bone development

- Other names: Melnick–Needles osteodysplasty
- This condition is inherited in an X-linked dominant manner.
- Differential diagnosis: Multiple epiphyseal dysplasia
- Frequency: 0.0001%

Melnick–Needles syndrome (MNS), also known as Melnick–Needles osteodysplasty, is an extremely rare congenital disorder that affects primarily bone development. Patients with Melnick–Needles syndrome have typical faces (exophthalmos, full cheeks, micrognathia and malalignment of teeth), flaring of the metaphyses of long bones, s-like curvature of bones of legs, irregular constrictions in the ribs, and sclerosis of base of skull.

In males, the disorder is nearly always lethal in infancy. Lifespan of female patients might not be affected.

Melnick–Needles syndrome is associated with mutations in the FLNA gene and is inherited in an X-linked dominant manner. As with many genetic disorders, there is no known cure to MNS.

The disorder was first described by John C. Melnick and Carl F. Needles in 1966 in two multi-generational families.

== Signs and symptoms ==
=== Craniofacial ===
Melnick–Needles syndrome causes distinctive craniofacial abnormalities. These include full cheeks, a prominent forehead, severe micrognathia and retrognathia. The later two features can cause patients to have difficulty eating and speaking. Other complications that can arise from micrognathia include obstructive sleep apnea, upper airway restriction, increased susceptibility to pneumonia and occasionally even respiratory failure

=== Skeletal ===
Individuals with Melnick-Needles typically have a small rib cage and narrow shoulders. The ribs themselves are "ribbon" like and the clavicles are unusually short. The lower portion of the chest appears hollow. Spinal abnormalities may also occur (pectus excavatum). Kyphoscoliosis is common.

S-like curvature of the leg bones is another feature of Melnick–Needles syndrome. The connection between the femur and hip bone may be misaligned, causing an unusual gait. The ilium can be flared and the unusually shape of the pelvis in patients with Melnick–Needles syndrome can make childbirth difficult for affected females.

=== Other potential symptoms ===
Other abnormalities associated with Melnick–Needles syndrome include blue sclera, strabismus, bilateral exophthalmus, conductive hearing loss, mitral valve prolapse, tricuspid valve prolapse, bowel malrotation and hydronephrosis. Prune belly syndrome and omphalocele have been observed in lethally affected males.

== Prognosis ==
Females with Melnick–Needles syndrome may display various clinical characteristics of the disease. Symptoms can vary widely even between members of the same family.

Males with Melnick–Needles syndrome experience considerably more severe symptoms than females. As a result, they are often stillborn or die shortly after birth. However, survival is possible in males if mosaicism is present.

== See also ==
- Osteochondrodysplasia
- Oto-palato-digital syndrome
