= Pelvic kidney =

Abnormal location of a kidney in the pelvis

- Specialty: Nephrology

A pelvic kidney, also known as an ectopic kidney, is a normal kidney located in the pelvis, instead of the abdomen. This occurs when a kidney does not ascend from its original location in the pelvis to its final location during prenatal development. They usually present no symptoms, but can increase risk of certain illnesses and healthcare problems.

== Signs and symptoms ==
Often, a person with a pelvic kidney will go through their whole life not even knowing they have a pelvic kidney.

While symptoms are uncommon, some people with a pelvic kidney may experience abdominal or back pain, fever, hematuria, high blood pressure, or a burning sensation while urinating.

=== Complications ===
Typically, the kidney functions normally despite being in the wrong location. However, it can develop complications. A pelvic kidney can make it more difficult to diagnose kidney infections and kidney cancer. The renal artery and the renal vein may be stretched if they remain attached to the normal locations on the abdominal aorta and the inferior vena cava, which can lead to illness.

A pelvic kidney may increase one's risk of developing urinary tract infections and kidney stones. The condition may also result in hydronephrosis. Children with a pelvic kidney may need to wear certain protective equipment while playing sports to prevent injuries.

== Causes ==
In the development of the human embryo, the metanephric kidneys fail to ascend and usually remain at the brim of the pelvis. This clinical scenario may present no signs or symptoms and the kidneys may function normally. It is associated at times with Müllerian dysgenesis.

== Diagnosis ==
A pelvic kidney is discovered on newborn kidney ultrasound screening. It may also be detected if complications arise later in life for this or a completely different reason, and during investigations.

== Epidemiology ==
Between 1 in 2,200 and 1 in 3,000 people may have a pelvic kidney.

== History ==
A pelvic kidney is also known as an ectopic kidney.
