= Odontoonychodermal dysplasia =

- Specialty: Medical genetics
- Prevention: none
- Frequency: rare

Odontoonychodermal dysplasia is a rare genetic disorder which is characterized by systemic abnormalities of the teeth, the nails of the fingers and toes, the skin, the hair cells, and the sweat glands. It is a type of syndromic ectodermal dysplasia.

== Signs and symptoms ==
Individuals with this condition typically have the following symptoms: complete absence of both the deciduous and permanent teeth, cone-shaped canines and incisors, generalized dysplasia of the nails, palmoplantar hyperkeratosis, chronic skin dryness, and variable degrees of both hypotrichosis and either hyperhidrosis or hypohidrosis.

=== Complications ===
The oligodontia associated with this condition results in both functional/mechanical and cosmetic problems.

Hyperhidrosis can increase one's susceptibility to infections and might cause problems with oneself's self esteem.

Hypohidrosis can result in a higher risk for suffering from heat-related illness, such as heat stroke.

== Genetics ==
This condition is caused by homozygous mutations of the WNT10A gene, located in the second chromosome. These mutations are inherited in an autosomal recessive manner, which means that for a child to be born with the condition, they must inherit two copies of a mutation from both parents.

== Diagnosis ==
This condition can be diagnosed through symptomatic examination and genetic testing.

== Treatment ==
Treatment is focused on the symptoms

== Epidemiology ==
According to OMIM, around 30 cases from families in Lebanon, Germany, Turkey, and India have been described in medical literature.

== History ==
This condition was first discovered in 1983 by Fadhil et al. when they described 3 incestuous Muslim Shiite sibships from a family in Lebanon. Of the 24 children produced in these sibships, 7 were affected with what they (the researchers) a thought to be a novel ectodermal dysplasia syndrome, said children had nail dystrophy, peg-shaped incisors, erythematous facial lesions, hyperhidrotic palms and soles with thickened skin, dry sparse hair, and eyebrow thinning.

In 2007, Adaimy et al. found the molecular cause for this condition in affected members of 3 consanguineous Muslim Shiite families in Lebanon: they found a homozygous mutation in the WNT10A gene that was shared by all of the affected family members, said mutation resulted in a short, prematurely terminated protein of 232 amino acids instead of the usual amount of 417. Of the three families, two had been previously described in medical literature.

== See also ==
- Anonychia
- Congenital onychodysplasia of the index fingers
