= Sugarman syndrome =

- Sugarman syndrome has an autosomal recessive pattern of inheritance.

Sugarman syndrome is the common name of autosomal recessive oral-facial-digital syndrome type III, one of ten distinct genetic disorders that involve developmental defects to the mouth.

Alternative names for this condition include: Brachydactyly of the hands and feet with duplication of the first toes, Sugarman brachydactyly and Brachydactyly with major proximal phalangeal shortening.
