= Orofaciodigital syndrome 1 =

- Other names: OFDI, OFDSI, Oral-facial-digital syndrome type 1
- This condition is inherited in an X-linked dominant manner.
- Specialty: Medical genetics

Orofaciodigital syndrome 1 (OFD1), also called Papillon-Léage and Psaume syndrome, is an X-linked congenital disorder characterized by malformations of the face, oral cavity, and digits with polycystic kidney disease and variable involvement of the central nervous system.

== Cause ==
Orofaciodigital syndrome type 1 is caused by mutations in the OFD1 gene. OFD1 localizes to both centrosomes and basal bodies within the human genetic cellular structure. This suggests that this syndrome may fall into a broad category of ciliary diseases. The ciliary organelles are present in many cellular types throughout the human body. Cilia defects adversely affect numerous critical developmental signaling pathways essential to cellular development.

Other types include:

- OMIM: 252100 Mohr syndrome; Orofaciodigital syndrome 2 at NIH's Office of Rare Diseases
- OMIM: 258860 Orofaciodigital syndrome 4 at NIH's Office of Rare Diseases
- OMIM: 300238 Orofaciodigital syndrome, Shashi type at NIH's Office of Rare Diseases
- OMIM: 277170 Varadi Papp syndrome; OFD6 at NIH's Office of Rare Diseases

=== Relation to other rare genetic disorders ===
Recent findings in genetic research have suggested that a large number of genetic disorders, both genetic syndromes and genetic diseases, that were not previously identified in the medical literature as related, may be, in fact, highly related in the genotypical root cause of these widely varying, phenotypically-observed disorders. Orofaciodigital syndrome has been found to be a ciliopathy. Other known ciliopathies include primary ciliary dyskinesia, Bardet–Biedl syndrome, polycystic kidney disease and polycystic liver disease, nephronophthisis, Alström syndrome, Meckel–Gruber syndrome and some forms of retinal degeneration.

== Diagnosis ==
Orofaciodigital syndrome type 1 is diagnosed through genetic testing. Some symptoms of Orofaciodigital syndrome type 1 are oral features such as, split tongue, benign tumors on the tongue, cleft palate, hypodontia and other dental abnormalities. Other symptoms of the face include hypertelorism and micrognathia. Bodily abnormalities such as webbed, short, joined, or abnormally curved fingers and toes are also symptoms of Orofaciodigital syndrome type 1. The most frequent symptoms are accessory oral frenulum, broad alveolar ridges, frontal bossing, high palate, hypertelorism, lobulated tongue, median cleft lip, and wide nasal bridge. Genetic screening of the OFD1 gene is used to officially diagnose a patient who has the syndrome, this is detected in 85% of individuals who are suspected to have Orofaciodigital syndrome type 1.

== Management ==
Orofaciodigital syndrome type 1 can be treated with reconstructive surgery or the affected parts of the body. Surgery of cleft palate, tongue nodules, additional teeth, accessory frenulae, and orthodontia for malocclusion. Routine treatment for patients with renal disease and seizures may also be necessary. Speech therapy and special education in the later development may also be used as management.

== See also ==
- OFD1
