= Ovarian serous cystadenoma =

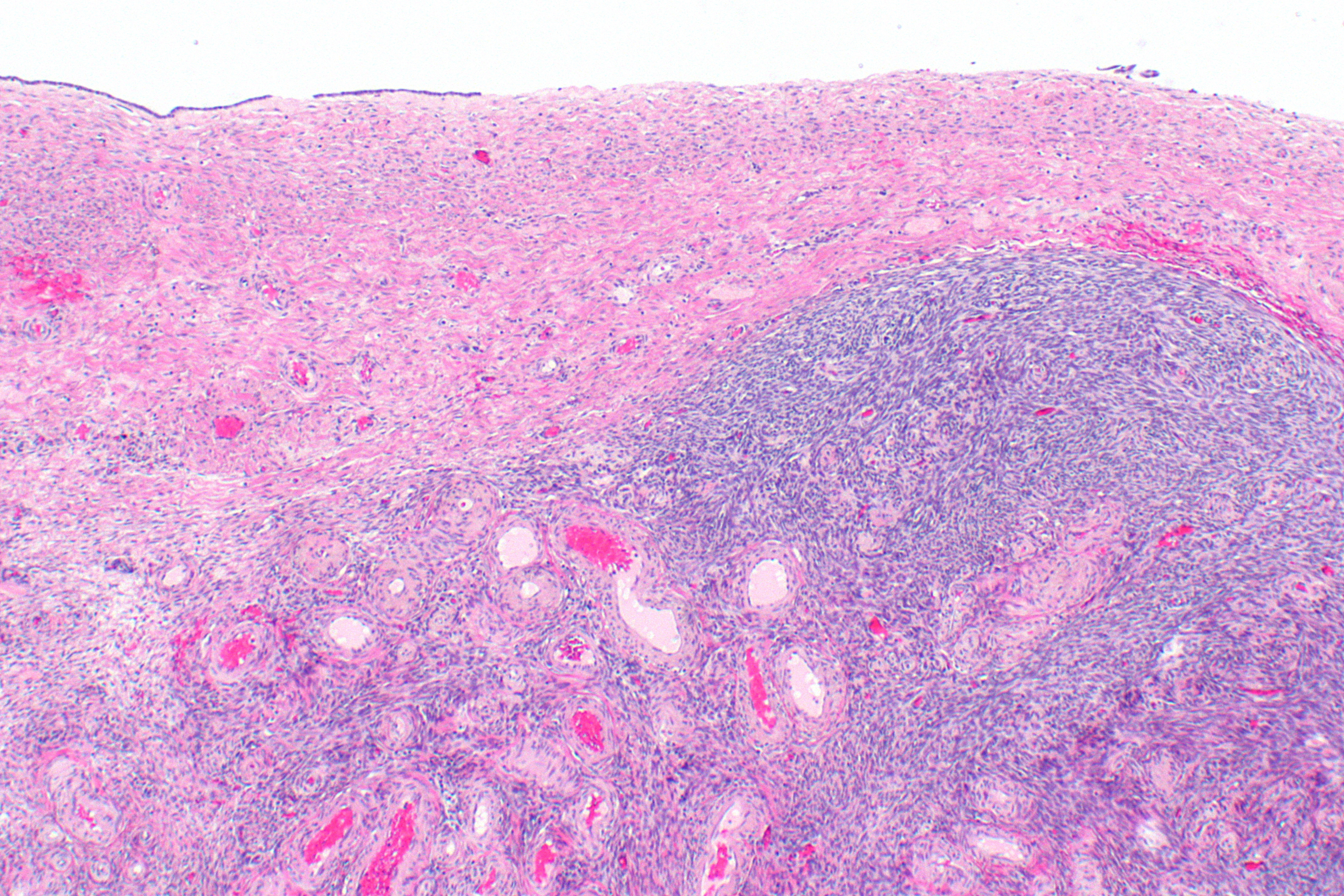
- Ovarian serous cystadenoma. The cystic space is at the top of the image. Ovarian parenchyma is seen at the bottom right. H&E stain.
- Specialty: Gynaecology

Ovarian serous cystadenoma is a non-cancerous type of tumor of the ovary. It is typically larger than 1 cm in diameter and presents with symptoms of a growth in the pelvis, or is discovered when investigating something else. A fifth occur in both ovaries at the same time.

It has a very superficial resemblance to the most common type of ovarian cancer (serous carcinoma of the ovary) under the microscope; however, (1) it is virtually impossible to mix-up with its malignant counterpart (serous carcinoma), and (2) does not share genetic traits of indeterminate serous tumours, also called serous borderline tumours, that may transform into serous carcinoma.

Serous cystadenomas (of the ovary) are not related to serous cystadenomas of the pancreas, i.e. the presence of an ovarian or pancreatic one does not suggest an increased risk for the other one.

Diagnostic procedures includes initially ultrasound or colour doppler study to know about size and nature of mass and sometimes CECT. Blood investigation includes CA-125 level for screening and further CEA, beta hCG levels, AFP, CA19-9, LDH level to confirm diagnosis. And before going to surgery routine investigation to be done.

== Diagnosis ==
Serous cystadenomas are diagnosed by histomorphologic examination, by pathologists. Grossly, they are, usually small unilocular cysts that contain clear, straw-coloured fluid. However, they may sometimes be multilocular. Microscopically the cyst lining consists of a simple epithelium, whose cells may be either:

- be columnar and tall and contain cilia, resembling normal tubal epithelium
- be cuboidal and have no cilia, resembling ovarian surface epithelium

=== Microscopical images ===
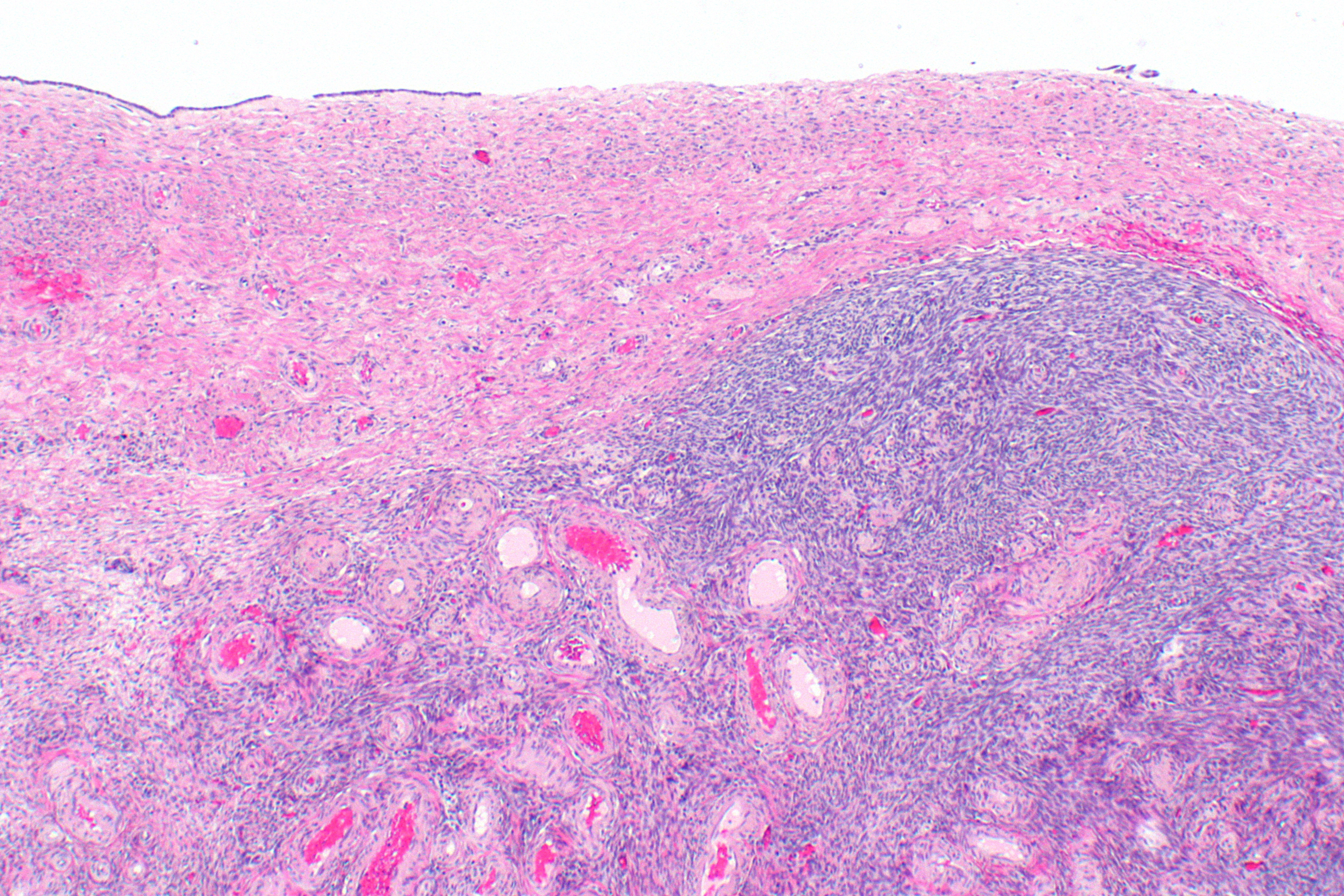

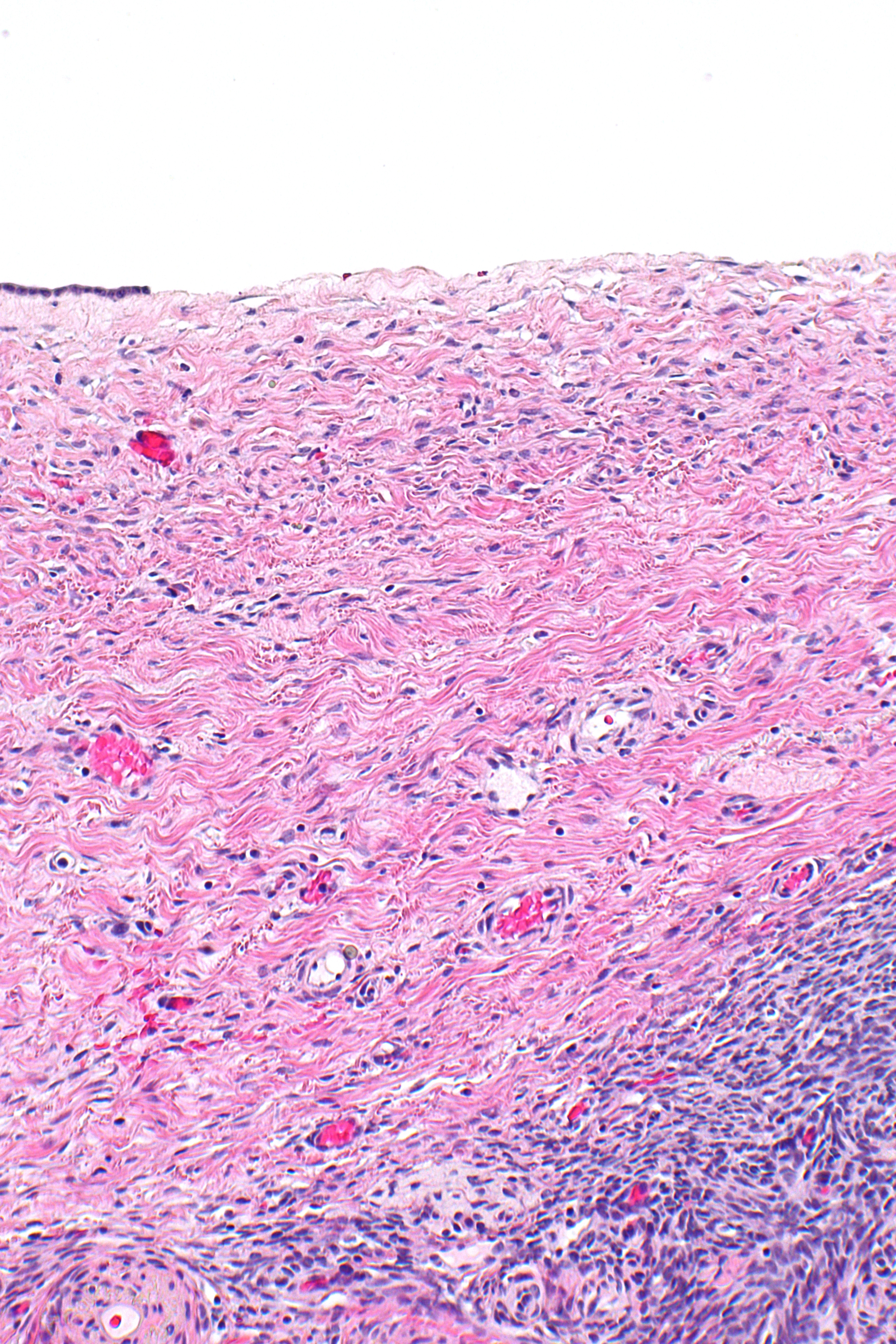

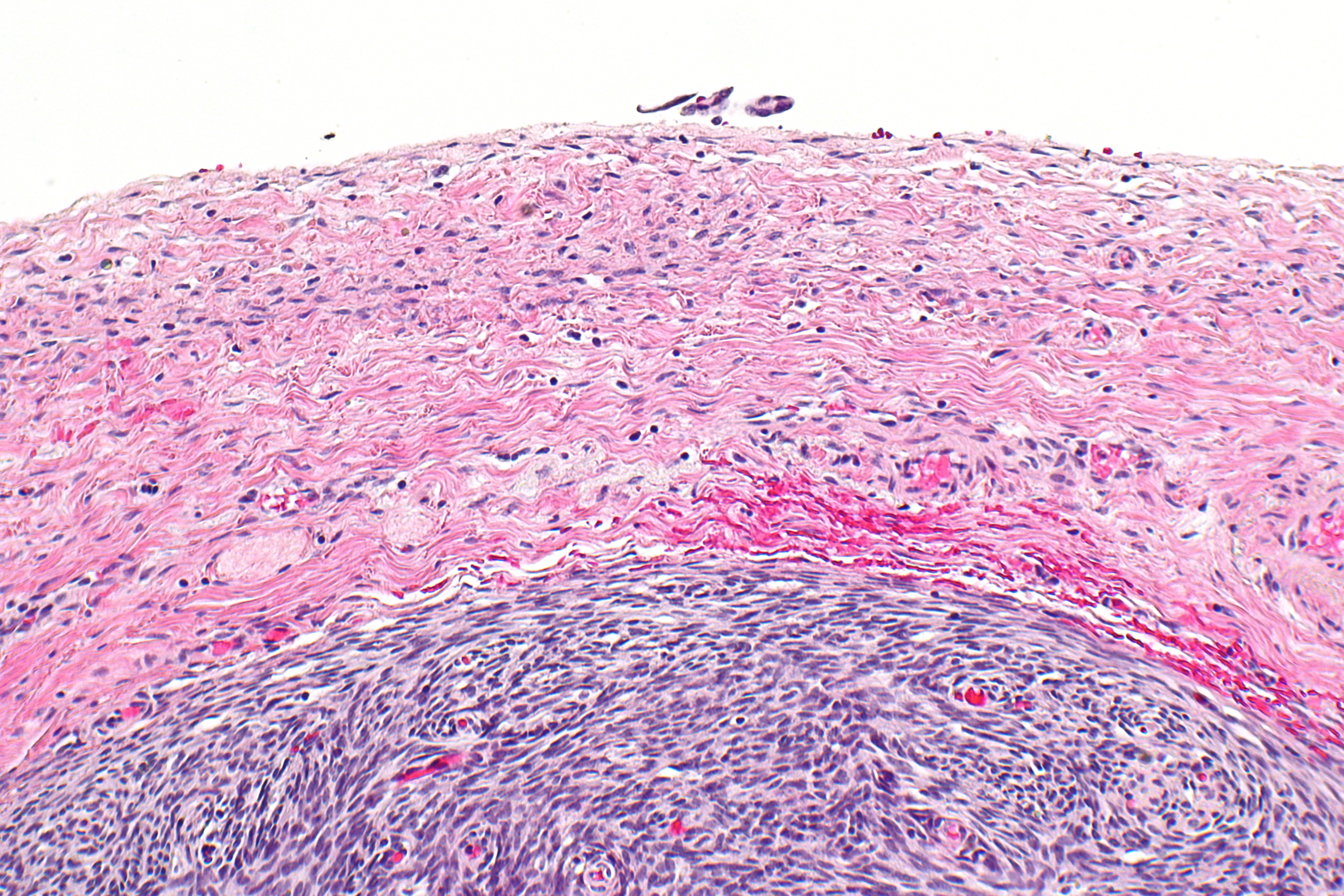

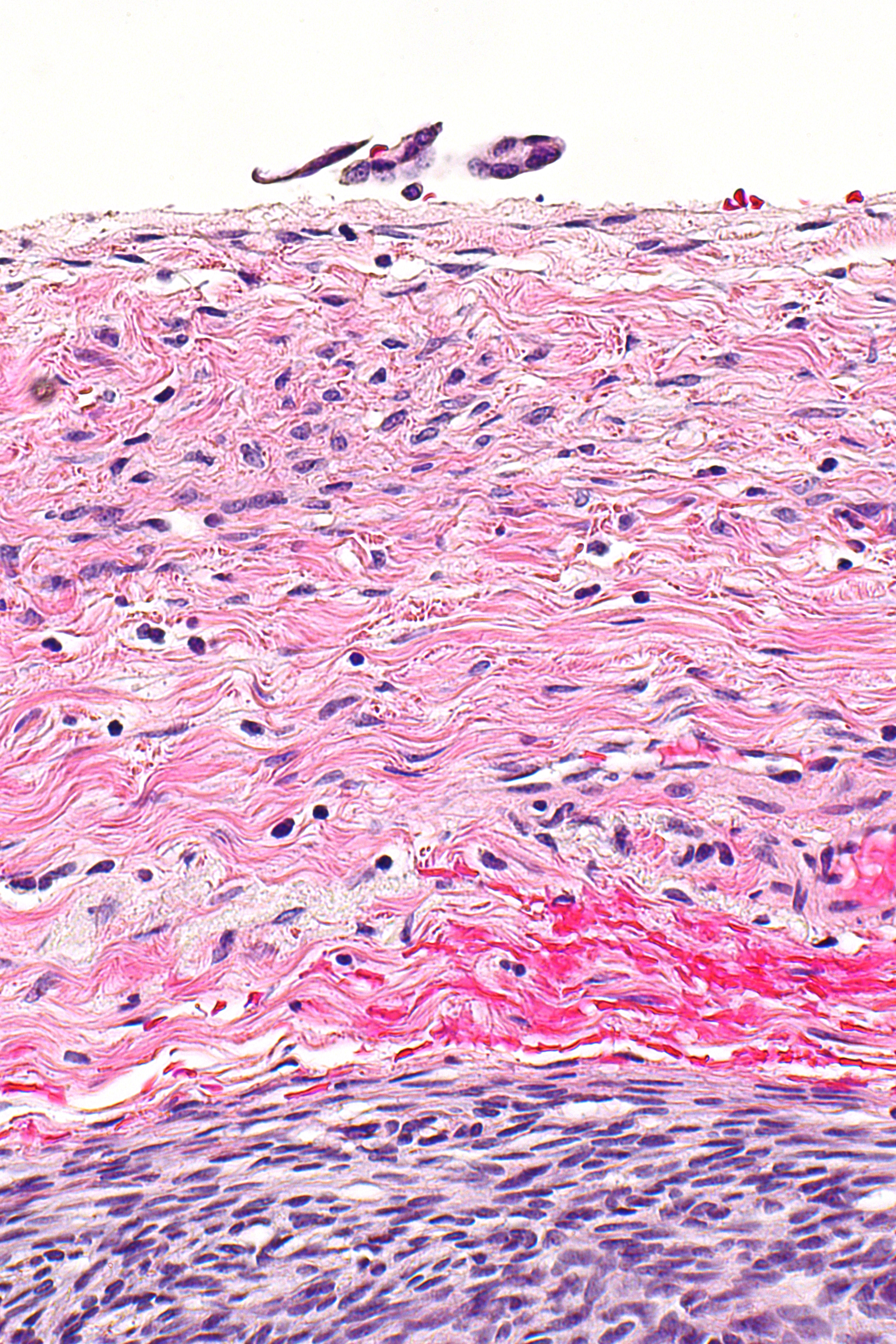

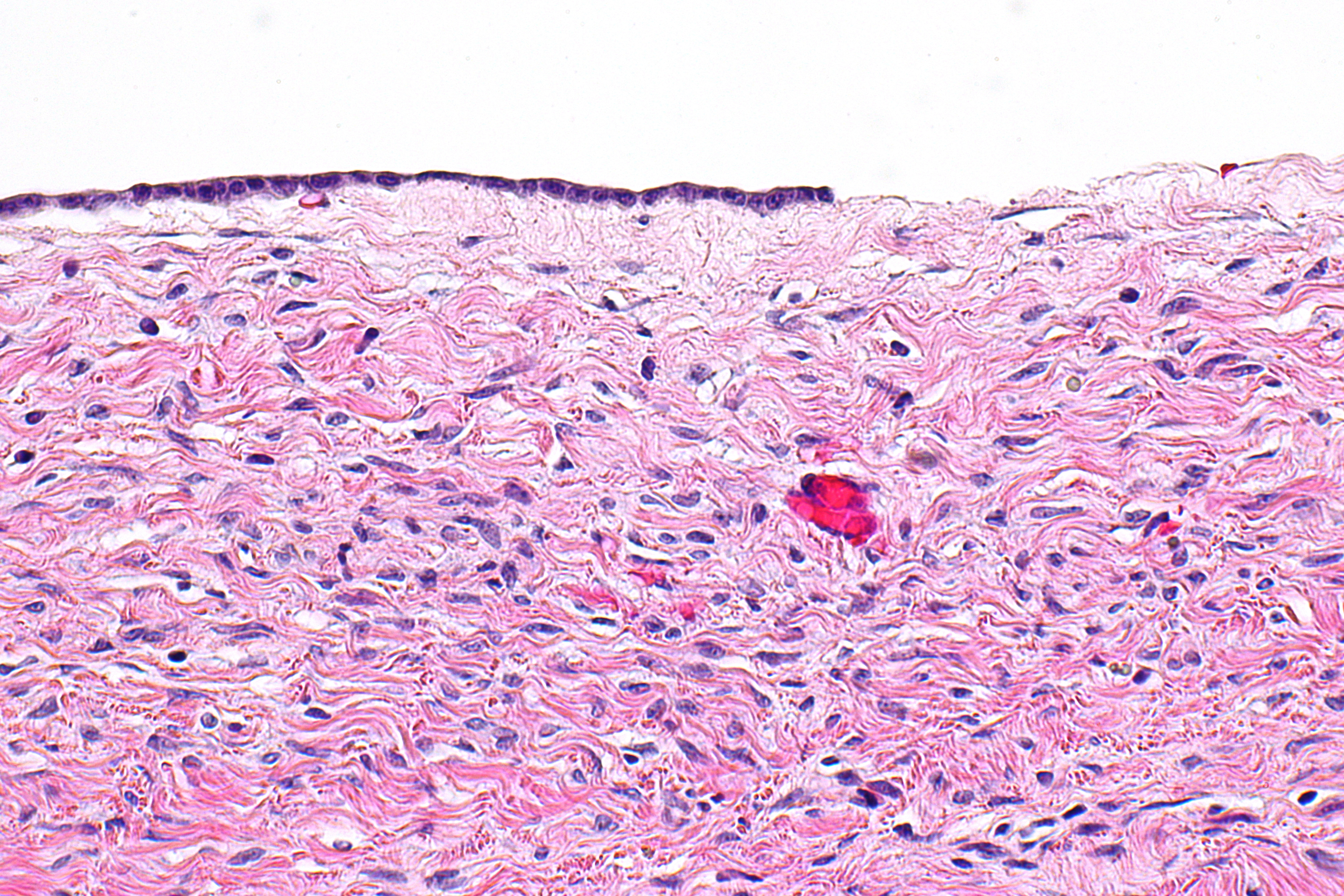

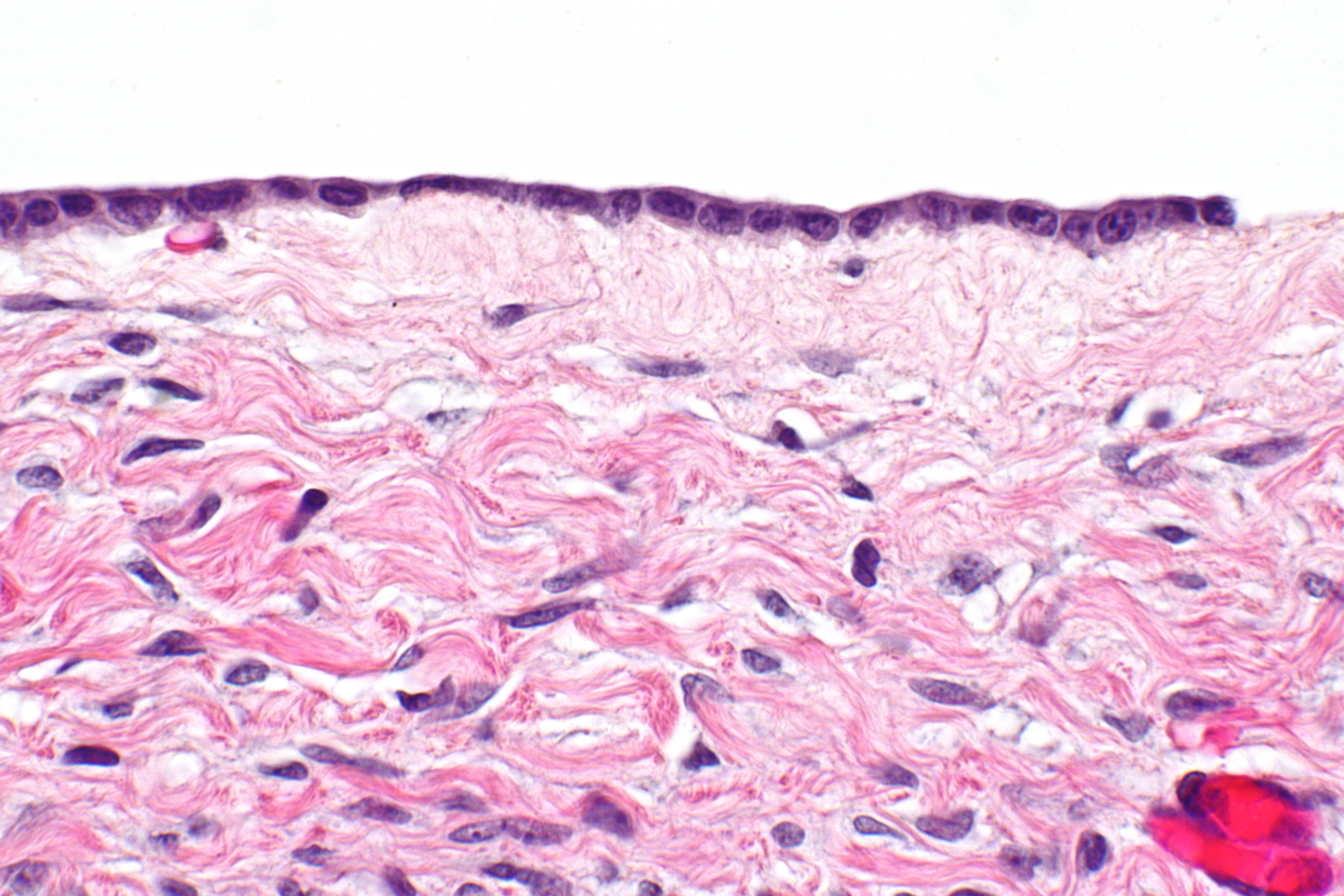

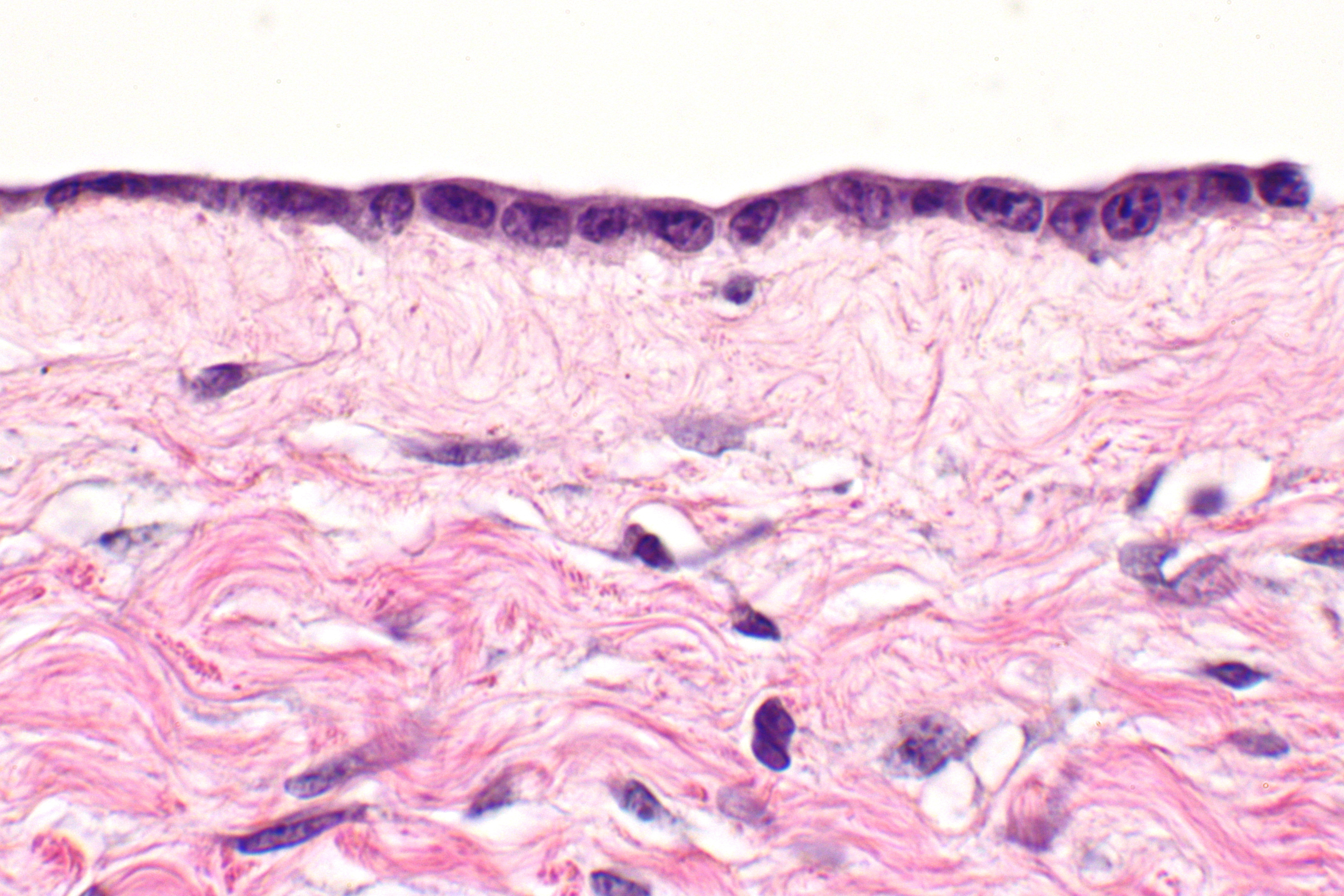

== Epidemiology ==
Ovarian serous cystadenoma accounts for the largest proportion of benign ovarian tumours, making up over 50–80% of all benign epithelial ovarian tumours. Its prevalence peaks between 60–70 years of the human lifespan. Serous ovarian cystadenocarcinomas account for ~25% of serous tumours.

Ovarian serous cystadenomas are most commonly diagnosed in postmenopausal women, with a higher incidence observed in those aged 60 to 70 years, while the malignant form, serous cystadenocarcinomas, represents a significant proportion of serous tumors, contributing to about 25% of these cases.

== See also ==
- Ovarian cancer
- Serous carcinoma
