= Oto-palato-digital syndrome =

X-linked recessive genetic disorders

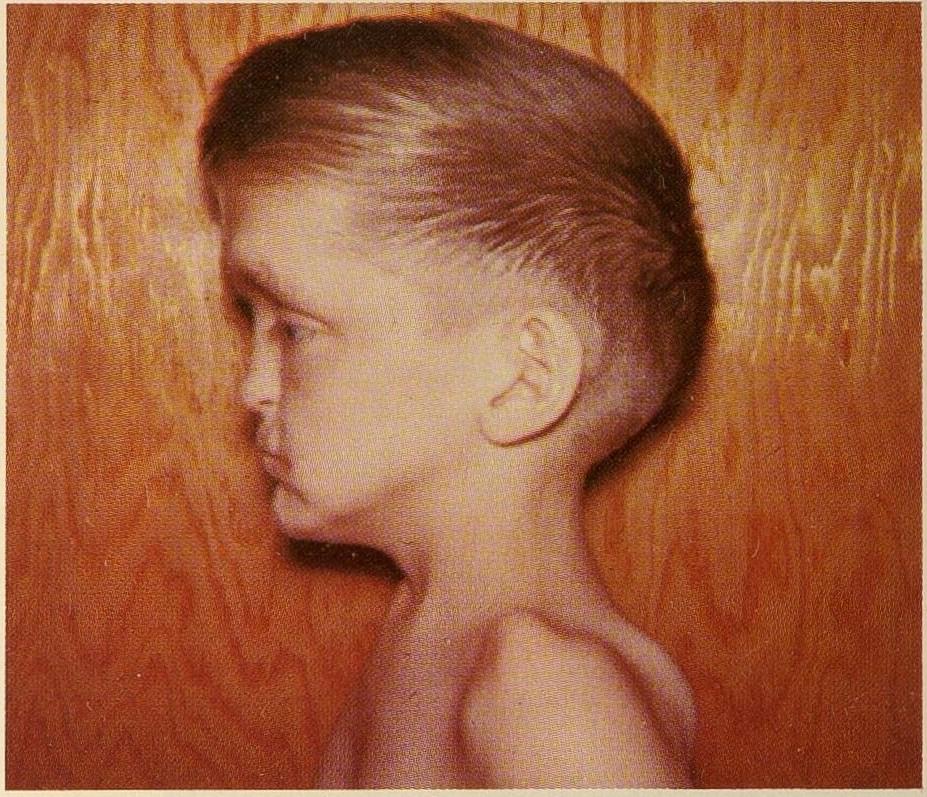
Boy with oto-palato-digital syndrome

Oto-palato-digital syndrome is the generalised term for two conditions, oto-palato-digital syndrome type I (OPD1) and oto-palato-digital syndrome type II (OPD2), that are both X-linked recessive genetic disorders with overlapping phenotypes. The most severe phenotypes of each syndrome occur only in males, with females generally having attenuated forms of the condition, although this does not apply to all individual cases. Some writers conceptualise oto-palato-digital syndrome as a spectrum disorder including two similarly-presenting genetic syndromes, frontometaphyseal dysplasia and Melnick-Needles syndrome.

The conditions are characterised by skeletal abnormalities, cleft palate (a hole in the roof of the mouth), and hearing loss. These symptoms are common to craniofacial syndromes as a whole. Hand defects are particularly associated. Of the conditions, OPD1 has the milder phenotype, with normal intelligence and modestly reduced stature. In OPD2, the characteristic facial features are more severe and intellectual disability frequent; most OPD2 cases in males are stillborn or die during infancy. As an X-linked recessive disorder, both forms are generally more severe in males, who have one X chromosome, than females, who have two. Reports from patients of their experiences demonstrate a broad spectrum of symptom severity, including within families, which has also been reported in the medical literature.

Oto-palato-digital syndrome is caused by a gain-of-function mutation in the FLNA gene on the X chromosome. Women with one copy of the mutation will with each pregnancy have a 50% chance of passing it down to each child. Men with one copy of the mutation will pass it down to all daughters, and will not pass the mutation down to sons. Germline mosaicism for OPD1 has been reported, meaning that unaffected parents with an affected child have a slightly increased risk of bearing another.

The prevalence of oto-palato-digital syndrome is unknown, but estimated to be below 1 in 100,000.
