= Oculocerebrocutaneous syndrome =

Syndrome characterised by eye, central nervous system and skin malformations

- Other names: Delleman–Oorthuys syndrome
- Specialty: Medical genetics

Oculocerebrocutaneous syndrome is a condition characterized by orbital cysts, microphthalmia, porencephaly, agenesis of the corpus callosum, and facial skin tags.

== Presentation ==
The symptoms include:

- Skin lesions
  - Hypoplastic or aplastic skin defects
  - Pedunculated, hamartomatous or nodular skin appendages
- Eye lesions
  - Cystic microphthalmia
- Brain lesions
  - Forebrain anomalies
    - Agenesis of the corpus callosum
    - Enlarged lateral ventricles
    - Interhemispheric cysts
    - Hydrocephalus
    - Polymicrogyria
    - Periventricular nodular heterotopia
  - Mid-hindbrain malformation
    - Giant dysplastic tectum
    - Absent cerebellar vermis
    - Small cerebellar hemispheres
    - Large posterior fossa fluid collections

== Genetics ==
While the disorder is not fully understood, it is suspected that the gene(s) responsible may lie on the X chromosome.

== Diagnosis ==
=== Differential diagnosis ===
- Aicardi syndrome
- Encephalocraniocutaneous lipomatosis
- Focal dermal hypoplasia
- Oculo-auriculo-vertebral spectrum

== Epidemiology ==
This rare condition appears in males more frequently and had only 26 cases diagnosed in total by 2005.

== See also ==
- Ocular rosacea
- List of cutaneous conditions
