= Osteochondrodysplasia =

Group of disorders of bone and cartilage development

- Other names: Skeletal dysplasia
- Specialty: Orthopedic

An osteochondrodysplasia, (Note: Etymology: from Ancient Greek ὀστέο(ν) (ostéo(n)) 'bone', χόνδρο(ς) (khóndro(s)) 'cartiledge' and δυσ (dus) 'badly'.) or skeletal dysplasia, is a disorder of the development of bone and cartilage. Osteochondrodysplasias are rare diseases. About 1 in 5,000 babies are born with some type of skeletal dysplasia. Nonetheless, if taken collectively, genetic skeletal dysplasias or osteochondrodysplasias comprise a recognizable group of genetically determined disorders with generalized skeletal affection. These disorders lead to disproportionate short stature and bone abnormalities, particularly in the arms, legs, and spine. Skeletal dysplasia can result in marked functional limitation and even mortality.

Osteochondrodysplasias or skeletal dysplasia subtypes can overlap in clinical aspects, therefore plain radiography is absolutely necessary to establish an accurate diagnosis. Magnetic resonance imaging can provide further diagnostic insights and guide treatment strategies especially in cases of spinal involvement. As some disorders that cause skeletal dysplasia have treatments available, early diagnosis is particularly important, but may be challenging due to overlapping features and symptoms that may also be common in unaffected children.

== Types ==
=== Achondroplasia ===
Achondroplasia is a type of autosomal dominant genetic disorder that is the most common cause of dwarfism. It is also the most common type of non-lethal osteochondrodysplasia or skeletal dysplasia. The prevalence is approximately 1 in 25,000 births. Achondroplastic dwarfs have short stature, with an average adult height of 131 cm (4 feet, 3 inches) for males and 123 cm (4 feet, 0 inches) for females. In achondroplasia the dwarfism is readily apparent at birth. Likewise, craniofacial abnormalities in the form of macrocephaly and mid-face hypoplasia are present at birth. The previous clinical findings differentiate between achondroplasia and pseudoachondroplasia in which dwarfism is not recognizable at birth and craniofacial abnormalities are not considered a disease feature. Plain radiography plays an additional and important role in the differential diagnosis of achondroplasia.

=== Pseudoachondroplasia ===
Pseudoachondroplasia is an osteochondrodysplasia made distinctive by disproportionate short stature, hip and knee deformities, brachydactyly (short fingers) and ligamentous laxity. It affects at least 1 in 20,000 individuals. Pseudoachondroplasia is inherited in an autosomal dominant manner and is caused solely by mutations in the cartilage oligomeric matrix protein COMP gene. It's distinguished by a moderate to severe form of disproportionate short-limb short stature. The limb shortening is fundamentally confined to the proximal limb segments i.e., Femurs and humeri. A known presenting feature is a waddling gait, noticed at the onset of walking. A prompt diagnosis of a skeletal dysplasia in general and Pseudoachondroplasia in specific is still based upon a comprehensive clinical and radiographic correlation. A detailed radiographic examination of the axial and appendicular skeleton is invaluable for the differential diagnosis of Pseudoachondroplasia. Coxa vara (reduced neck shaft angle), broad femoral necks, short femurs and humeri, and bullet-shaped vertebrae are noticeable radiographic features. Additionally, the presence of metaphyseal broadening, cupping and dense line of ossification about the knee can simulate rachitic changes. These radiographic features are collectively known as rachitic-like changes. The presence of epiphyseal changes serves as an important differentiating feature from achondroplasia.

=== Osteogenesis imperfecta ===
COL1A1/2-related osteogenesis imperfecta is inherited in an autosomal dominant manner. The proportion of cases caused by a De novo COL1A1 or COL1A2 mutations are the cause of osteogenesis imperfecta in the vast majority of perinatally lethal osteogenesis imperfecta, and progressively deforming osteogenesis imperfecta. In classic non-deforming osteogenesis imperfecta with blue sclerae or common variable osteogenesis imperfecta with normal sclerae, nearly 60% of cases are de novo. COL1A1/2-related osteogenesis imperfecta is identified by repeated fractures with trivial trauma, defective dentinogenesis imperfecta (DI), and hearing loss. The clinical features of COL1A1/2-related osteogenesis imperfecta can be highly variable ranging from severe and lethal perinatal fractures to individuals with minimal tendency to repeated fractures and skeletal deformities and with a normal stature and life span. In between the clinical spectrum may include individuals with various degrees of disabling skeletal deformities and short stature. The radiographic findings of osteogenesis imperfecta include; long bone deformations such as bowing of the tibias and femurs, pencil-like deformity and tapering of bones, cortical thinning and rarefaction, pathologic fractures at various degrees of healing, bone shortening and vertebral wedging. Accordingly, COL1A1/2-related osteogenesis imperfecta has been classified into four sub-types (I, II, III, and IV) built upon the diversity of the radioclinical features.

=== Mucopolysaccharidosis ===
Mucopolysaccharidoses (MPS) constitute a commonly seen group of osteochondrodysplasias. Mucopolysaccharidosis can cause a wide spectrum of clinical and radiologic manifestations ranging from mild skeletal and systemic involvement to severe life-threatening manifestations. It is caused by a contiguous gene duplication or deletion syndrome in which multiple genes are involved. All forms of MPS are inherited in an autosomal recessive pattern, except for of MPS II, or Hunter syndrome, which is X-linked. They are caused by an abnormal function of the lysosomal enzymes, which blocks degradation of mucopolysaccharides and leads to accumulation of harmful byproducts, namely, heparan sulfate, dermatan sulfate, and keratan sulfate. The resulting cellular malfunction can lead to a diverse array of skeletal and visceral manifestations. MPS have been subcategorized according to the type of enzyme inadequacy and glycoprotein accumulated.

=== Cleidocranial dysostosis ===
Cleidocranial dysostosis is a general skeletal condition named for the collarbone (cleido-) and cranium deformities which people with it often have. Common features include:

- Partly or completely missing collarbones.
- A soft spot on the top of the head where the fontanelle failed to close.
- Underdeveloped bones and joints.
- Supernumerary teeth among the permanent teeth.
- Unerupted permanent teeth.
- Bossing (bulging) of the forehead.
- Hypertelorism.

=== Fibrous dysplasia ===
Fibrous dysplasia causes bone thinning and growths or lesions in one or more bones of the human body.

These lesions are tumor-like growths that consist of replacement of the medullary bone with fibrous tissue, causing the expansion and weakening of the areas of bone involved. Especially when involving the skull or facial bones, the lesions can cause externally visible deformities. The skull is often, but not necessarily, affected, and any other bones can be involved.

=== Langer–Giedion syndrome ===
Langer–Giedion syndrome is a very rare genetic disorder caused by a deletion of chromosomal material. Diagnosis is usually made at birth or in early childhood. The features associated with this condition include mild to moderate learning difficulties, short stature, unique facial features, small head and skeletal abnormalities including bony growths projecting from the surfaces of bones.

=== Maffucci syndrome ===
Maffucci syndrome is a sporadic disease characterized by the presence of multiple enchondromas associated with multiple simple or cavernous soft tissue hemangiomas. Lymphangiomas may also be apparent.

Patients are normal at birth and the syndrome manifests during childhood and puberty. The enchondromas affect the extremities and their distribution is asymmetrical.

=== Osteosclerosis ===
Osteosclerosis, an elevation in bone density, is normally detected on an X-ray as an area of whiteness and is where the bone density has significantly increased.

=== Other ===
- Deformity type Erlenmeyer flask gives a distal femur similar to an Erlenmeyer flask. It may result from Gaucher disease.
- Kashin–Beck disease
- Melnick–Needles syndrome
- Ovine chondrodysplasia
- Familial osteodysplasia, Anderson type
- Ulna metaphyseal dysplasia syndrome

== Diagnosis ==
The diagnosis is mainly based upon delineating the specific clinical and radiographic pattern of skeletal involvement. However, the different types of skeletal dysplasia can overlap considerably in their clinical presentation. Molecular or genetic analysis may be required to resolve diagnostic difficulties.

=== Differential diagnosis ===
Juvenile idiopathic arthritis may closely resemble the clinical presentation of some osteochondrodysplasias or genetic skeletal dysplsias. In that, both conditions can present with swollen, stiff and deformed joints.

Type II collagen disorders are caused by variants in the COL2A1 gene. Type II collagen disorders can result in mild disease or severe which can cause death within weeks of birth. Infants with the severe form of the disease would be born with clear indications of the disease, such as disproportionate short stature, skeletal dysplasia, distinctive eye abnormalities, cleft palate, and others. However, infants with mild disease may only experience arthritis at birth, but may progress to more severe disease later in life. Early diagnosis can be challenging. Furthermore, type II collagenopathies have significant phenotypic overlap with conditions such as MPS. Guidelines are available to ensure healthcare professional are aware of the conditions and the symptoms of disease to support efficient diagnosis.

== Treatment ==
Emerging therapies for genetic skeletal dysplasias include enzyme replacement therapy, small molecule therapy, hematopoietic stem cell transplantation and gene therapy. These therapies aim at preventing disease progression and thus improving quality of life. Enzyme replacement therapies are some of the mucopolysaccharidoses and Gaucher disease. Results have shown effectivity of enzyme replacement therapy. Hematopoietic stem cell transplantation can be lifesaving for some disorders, such as with malignant infantile osteopetrosis.

Even with treatments such as enzyme replacement therapy and stem cell transplantation, people with skeletal dysplasia often require orthopedic surgery and other disease management interventions. There is a lack of information available to support these patients as most physicians may only see one or two skeletal dysplasia patients in their lifetime. Guidelines are available to support best practices for managing several areas of skeletal dysplasia, such as the craniofacial aspects of skeletal dysplasia, spinal disorders, diagnosis and management of type II collagen disorders, pregnancy of people with skeletal dysplasia, peri-operative management, and foramen magnum stenosis in achondroplasia. Written and video resources for patients with skeletal dysplasia and caregivers are also available.

== Management ==
Timely management of skeletal dysplasia is important to combat functional deterioration. Due to rarity of the individual disorders that cause skeletal dysplasia, management can be challenging if a patient does not have access to a facility that has physicians who specialize in skeletal dysplasia. Guidelines have been developed for the management different aspects of skeletal dysplasia, including best practices for managing craniofacial and spinal manifestations, diagnosis and management of type II collagen disorders, pregnancy of people with skeletal dysplasia, peri-operative management, and foramen magnum stenosis in achondroplasia.
