= Ovarian remnant syndrome =

- Other names: Residual ovary syndrome

Ovarian remnant syndrome is a condition that occurs when ovarian tissue is left behind following oophorectomy, causing development of a pelvic mass, pelvic pain, and occasionally dyspareunia. Ovarian remnant syndrome (ORS) is characterized by the presence of residual ovarian tissue after a woman has had surgery to remove one ovary or both ovaries (oophorectomy).

== Signs and symptoms ==
If ovarian hormones are present after the ovaries are removed can be a sign that ovarian tissue still remains. Signs and symptoms may include pelvic pain, a pelvic mass, or the absence of menopause after oophorectomy. Factors may include pelvic adhesions (limiting ability to see the ovary or causing it to adhere to other tissues); anatomic variations; bleeding during surgery; or poor surgical technique. Treatment is indicated for people with symptoms and typically involves surgery to remove the residual tissue. Therapy for those who refuse surgery, cannot have surgery, or do not have a pelvic mass may include hormonal therapy to suppress ovarian function.

Some women have symptoms consistent with endometriosis, including difficult or painful intercourse; urinary symptoms; or bowel symptoms. It is likely that some women with ORS don't have any symptoms, but the rate of this is unknown. In most cases, symptoms occur within the first five years of the oophorectomy, although there are reports of ORS presenting 20 years after the initial surgery.

== Cause ==
The cause of ORS is the unintentional retention of ovarian tissue after the procedure to remove the ovaries. If a woman is receiving hormone replacement therapy, distinguishing from other disease process may be difficult. Other confounding conditions contributing to ORS are thick and profuse pelvic adhesions, inflammation, bleeding after surgery (peri-operative bleeding), and ovaries which are retroperitoneal, can all contribute to the unintentional preservation of ovarian fragments.

== Risk factors ==
The risk of ovarian remnant (ORS) is increased by incomplete removal of the ovary at the time of oophorectomy. Surgical factors that contribute to incomplete removal include those that limit surgical exposure of the ovary, or compromise surgical technique. Factors may include:

- adhesions – these can limit visualization of the ovary and may also cause it to adhere to surrounding tissues. Adhesions are often present due to preexisting conditions and/or prior surgeries. In the majority of cases reported since 2007, endometriosis was the most common indication for the initial oophorectomy in patients who subsequently had ORS. Endometriosis increases the risk for functional ovarian tissue being embedded into adjacent structures, making complete excision of tissue challenging.
- Anatomic variations - unusual location of ovarian tissue, for example
- Intraoperative bleeding
- Poor surgical technique – this may include failure to obtain adequate exposure or restore adequate anatomy, or imprecise choice of incision site

Ovarian remnant (ORS) may first be considered in women who have undergone oophorectomy and have suggestive symptoms, the presence of a mass, or evidence of persistent ovarian function (by symptoms or laboratory testing). A history of oophorectomy is required, by definition, to make the diagnosis. Notes regarding the indication for the procedure and the procedure itself should be reviewed and may include prior abdominal or pelvic surgery, endometriosis, and/or poor surgical visualization. If ORS is possible, pelvic should be performed to evaluate for a pelvic mass.[1]

== Diagnosis ==
Surgical exploration and confirmation of possible ovarian tissue is required for the definitive diagnosis of ORS, and treatment by excision of the remnant ovarian tissue may be performed during the same procedure. For women who are not candidates for surgery, a clinical diagnosis can be made based on the symptoms and levels (follicle-stimulating hormone and estradiol, after bilateral oophorectomy) and/or findings consistent with the presence of residual ovarian tissue. Laparoscopy and histological assessment can aid in diagnosis.

== Treatment ==
Treatment for ovarian remnant (ORS) is generally indicated for women with suspected ORS who have symptoms (such as pain); have a pelvic mass; or need or desire complete removal of to decrease the risk of ovarian (for example, BRCA ). The mainstay of treatment is surgery to remove the residual ovarian tissue. Women with ORS with a pelvic mass should have appropriate evaluation for malignancy (cancer). Hormonal therapy to suppress ovarian function is an alternative treatment for those who refuse surgery, or those who are not candidates for surgery. Medications may be used to treat ORS and include GnRH agonists, danazol, or progesterone.

== Epidemiology ==
The incidence of ovarian remnant syndrome is difficult to determine. The available data are limited to case reports or to retrospective case series. The best available data are from a study describing the frequency and outcome of laparoscopy in women with chronic pelvic pain and/or a pelvic mass who were found to have ovarian remnants. In 119 women who underwent hysterectomy and oophorectomy by laparoscopy, ovarian remnants were known in 5 and were found during surgery in 21 patients (18%).[2] However, this was a small study and the participants were only symptomatic women. Therefore, it is not known whether the data can be extrapolated to include all women who have undergone oophorectomy.
