= DMTHF-Tc =

Radiopharmaceutical

DMTHF-Tc (^{5}N,^{10}N-dimethyl tetrahydrofolic acid) is a radiopharmaceutical that combines DMTHF, a modified folate, with technetium-99m (^{99m}Tc), a gamma emitting radionuclide, in a chelate conjugate. It shows selectivity for certain cancer cells that overexpress FR-α, and can be used for diagnostic imaging in nuclear medicine. DMTHF-Tc was developed by the Philip Low lab at Purdue University.

DMTHF-Tc is a type of folate targeting, an imaging and drug delivery method where the folate receptor (FR), being upregulated on malignant and inflamed cell types, is targeted. It can be used to reduce drug toxicity, as well as to visualize or quantify the amount of disease in cancerous and inflamed tissue. In normal tissues, the FR shows limited distribution. However, in cancer cells, FR-α shows upregulation, while FR-β expression is increased in inflamed tissues on activated macrophages. Because the receptor has these two isoforms that are only 76% homologous, the isoforms can be selectively bound in different types of diseased tissue for folate targeting.

== Synthesis ==
DMTHF is derived from Technetium (99mTc) etarfolatide (EC20), another ^{99m}Tc-based folate-linked chelator produced by Endocyte for folate-targeted imaging. ^{99m}Tc-EC20 is used to image sites of inflammation via FR-β. With the addition of two methyl groups, the dimethylated derivative shows selectivity for the α-isoform over the β-isoform of the FR.

== Affinity ==
By incubating increasing concentrations of ^{99m}Tc-DMTHF with KB human cancer cells, the affinity of ^{99m}Tc-DMTHF for FR-α was determined to be comparable to EC20.

Through dye conjugates and fluorescent antibodies specific for macrophages, it was determined that DMTHF-DyLight 680 showed little affinity for FR-β on CD11b+ macrophages. This dye conjugate, DMTHF-DyLight 680, showed affinity for FR-α on KB cells, confirming the researchers' previous results.

== Specificity ==
On mice with KB (FR-α-positive) and A549 (FR-α-negative) implanted shoulder tumors, ^{99m}Tc-DMTHF was taken up by the KB tumor but not the A549 tumor, demonstrated by radioisotope imaging and biodistribution analysis.

In an atherosclerosis model where macrophages accumulate, ^{99m}Tc-EC20, but not ^{99m}Tc-DMTHF, was taken up in the aorta-cardiac region. This result was expected because macrophages overexpress FR-β, and DMTHF has higher affinity for FR-α. In a collagen-induced arthritis model where the mice had systemic and joint inflammation, ^{99m}Tc-EC20 accumulated in the organs and limbs, which was not seen with ^{99m}Tc-DMTHF. In mice with muscle injury via cardiotoxin, the same result with a lack of uptake of ^{99m}Tc-DMTHF was observed as expected. Lastly, animals that had ulcerative colitis as well as M109 neck tumors were tested. The tumor displayed similar uptake of ^{99m}Tc-EC20 and 99mTc-DMTHF, while only ^{99m}Tc-EC20 was observed in the inflamed colon. This result was supported by DMTHF-dye conjugates. Therefore, DMTHF can be used in vivo to distinguish cancer from sites of inflammation.

== Targeting ==
=== Imaging ===
Currently, reliable imaging methods do not exist for isolating cancerous tissue from other diseased tissue, particularly in distinguishing cancer from inflammation. For example, ^{18}F-fluorodeoxyglucose (FDG) and similar radiolabelled biomolecules can be used to target cancer but also accumulate at sites of infection and inflammation. All of the folate receptor-targeted imaging agents reported in the literature prior to DMTHF could not distinguish between inflammation and cancer. To isolate cancer from inflammation, Low et al. (2012) developed DMTHF-Tc that shows specificity for FR-α. By chelating DMTHF to ^{99m}Tc, the same properties that make EC20 a good imaging agent for the FR allow ^{99m}Tc-DMTHF to target FR-α reliably.

=== Therapy ===
Although no studies to date have explored using a DMTHF-drug conjugate for targeted therapy of cancer, it could be a valuable tool for targeting FR-α expressing malignant tissues. Like an imaging agent, a therapeutic molecule consists of the targeting ligand, DMTHF, with a linker system. Instead of an imaging agent, the molecule would then include a drug payload, such as a chemotherapeutic.
