= Technetium (99mTc) etarfolatide =

Chemical compound

Technetium (^{99m}Tc) etarfolatide

Clinical data
- ATC code: V09IA08 (WHO)

Identifiers
- IUPAC name: (2R)-2-[(2S)-2-[(2S)-3-[[(4R)-4-[[4-[(2-amino-4-oxo-1H-pteridin-6-yl)methylamino]benzoyl]amino]-4-carboxybutanoyl]amino]-2-azanidylpropanoyl]azanidyl-3-carboxypropanoyl]azanidyl-3-hydroxy-3-oxopropane-1-thiolate oxotechnetium(4+) (^{99m}Tc)
- CAS Number: 479410-20-3
- PubChem CID: 71300440
- UNII: WVU7R99FQ6
- KEGG: D10491
- CompTox Dashboard (EPA): DTXSID20197365

Chemical and physical data
- Formula: C_{29}H_{32}N_{11}O_{12}S^{99m}Tc
- Molar mass: 855.595 g/mol
- 3D model (JSmol): Interactive image
- SMILES: n1c2C(=O)NC(N)=Nc2ncc1CNc(cc3)ccc3C(=O)N[C@@H](C(=O)O)CCC(=O)NC[C@H]([N+H2]4)C(=O)N5[C@@H](CC(=O)O)C(=O)N6[C@H](C(=O)O)CS[99Tc-]456=O

Technetium (^{99m}Tc) etarfolatide is an investigational non-invasive, folate receptor-targeting companion imaging agent that is being developed by Endocyte. Etarfolatide consists of a small molecule targeting the folate receptor and an imaging agent, which is based on technetium-99m. This companion imaging agent identifies cells expressing the folate receptor, including cancer and inflammatory cells.

Etarfolatide is currently being investigated together with the corresponding small molecule drug conjugate (SMDC) vintafolide in a Phase 3 study in platinum-resistant ovarian cancer and in a Phase 2b study in non-small cell lung cancer. It identifies patients with metastases that are positive for the folate receptor and therefore more likely to respond to treatment with vintafolide. Other folate receptor targeting SMDCs for the treatment of cancer, inflammatory diseases and kidney disease are in preclinical development and will also utilize etarfolatide as companion imaging agent.

The European Medicines Agency is reviewing the marketing authorisation application filings for both vintafolide and etarfolatide, for the treatment of patients with folate receptor-positive platinum-resistant ovarian cancer in combination with pegylated liposomal doxorubicin (PLD).
