= FOLR =

FOLR may refer to:

- FOLR1 (folate receptor 1, adult)
- FOLR2 (folate receptor 2, fetal)
