= Farletuzumab =

Chemical compound

Monoclonal antibody
- Type: Whole antibody
- Source: Humanized
- Target: FR-alpha

Clinical data
- Routes of administration: Intravenous injection
- ATC code: none

Identifiers
- CAS Number: 896723-44-7
- ChemSpider: none
- UNII: 2O09BG0OWA
- KEGG: D09343

Chemical and physical data
- Formula: C_{6466}H_{9928}N_{1716}O_{2020}S_{42}
- Molar mass: 145371.06 g·mol^{−1}

Farletuzumab (MORAb-003) is a humanized monoclonal antibody of IgG1/κ which is being investigated for the treatment of ovarian cancer.

This drug was developed by Morphotek, Inc.

It is targeted at folate receptor alpha (FRα) which is overexpressed in some cancers such as epithelial ovarian cancer (EOC) and non-small-cell lung carcinoma.

== Mechanism of action ==
Farletuzumab uses the following mechanisms of action:

- Antibody-dependent cellular cytotoxicity
- Complement-dependent cytotoxicity
- Inhibition of interaction between FRα and Lyn kinase
- Induces cell death associated with autophagy

== Adverse effects ==
Common adverse effects include hypersensitivity reactions, fever, chills, headache, fatigue, and diarrhea.
