= Endocyte =

American pharmaceutical company

- Type: Subsidiary
- Traded as: Nasdaq: ECYT
- Industry: Biopharmaceutical
- Founded: 1996; 30 years ago
- Headquarters: West Lafayette, Indiana, United States
- Key people: Mike Sherman (president and CEO)
- Number of employees: 78
- Parent: Novartis
- Website: www.endocyte.com

Endocyte is a biopharmaceutical company established in 1996 and headquartered in West Lafayette, Indiana, a resident of the Purdue Research Park. In 2011 the company completed successfully an initial public offering (IPO). As of 2013, the company had 93 employees. The original president and CEO, Ron Ellis, was succeeded by Mike Sherman, who held a CFO position at the company before this change in June 2016. In 2018 the company was acquired by Novartis.

Endocyte is advancing the first technology platform for the creation of small molecule drug conjugates (a.k.a. SMDCs), which consist of a small molecule linked to a potent drug, and is developing a pipeline of SMDCs together with non-invasive companion imaging agents for cancer, inflammatory diseases and kidney disease (autosomal-dominant polycystic kidney disease/ADPKDor PKD). Endocyte's lead drug candidate is vintafolide, an investigational targeted cancer therapeutic in late-stage development. In 2012 marketing rights were acquired by Merck for $120 million in an upfront payment and up to $880 million in milestone payments. Vintafolide is a small molecule drug conjugate consisting of a small molecule targeting the folate receptor, which is expressed on many cancers, such as ovarian cancer, and a potent chemotherapy drug, a derivative of vinblastine. Endocyte retained rights to the development and commercialization of etarfolatide.

Endocyte's other preclinical drug candidates also target the folate receptor as well as prostate-specific membrane antigen (PSMA) receptors. The company was formed based on technology developed by Philip Low (the company's CSO), and Christopher Leamon, PhD, the company's VP of research. This technology is a folic acid-based drug delivery system, referred to now as folate targeting. The company is also developing SMDCs with varying drug payloads as well as different ligands for other molecular targets, such as prostate-specific membrane antigen (PSMA) and has also developed, with Bristol-Myers Squibb, an epothilone-folic acid conjugate (BMS-753493), described at a 2008 conference.

In mid-October 2018, Novartis announced it would acquire Endocyte Inc for $2.1 billion ($24 per share) merging it with a newly created subsidiary. Endocyte will bolster Novartis' offering in its radiopharmaceuticals business, with Endocyte's first in class candidate ^{177}Lu-PSMA-617 being targeted against metastatic castration-resistant prostate cancer.
