= Epithelial ovarian cancer =

Epithelial ovarian cancer, or ovarian cancer of the epithelial cells, could be referring to:

- Surface epithelial-stromal tumor (SESTs), also known as ovarian adenocarcinoma
- Further diagnosis from ovarian cancer
