= Mirvetuximab soravtansine =

Pharmaceutical drug

Monoclonal antibody
- Type: Whole antibody
- Source: Chimeric
- Target: folate receptor alpha

Clinical data
- Trade names: Elahere
- Other names: mirvetuximab soravtansine-gynx
- AHFS/Drugs.com: Monograph
- MedlinePlus: a622075
- License data: US DailyMed: Mirvetuximab soravtansine
- Routes of administration: Intravenous
- ATC code: L01FX26 (WHO)

Legal status
- Legal status: CA: ℞-only / Schedule D; US: ℞-only; EU: Rx-only

Identifiers
- CAS Number: 1453084-37-1
- DrugBank: DB12489
- ChemSpider: 65322932
- UNII: 98DE7VN88D
- KEGG: D10954

Chemical and physical data
- Formula: C_{42}H_{61}ClN_{4}O_{14}S_{3}
- Molar mass: 977.59 g·mol^{−1}

Mirvetuximab soravtansine, sold under the brand name Elahere, is a medication used as a treatment for epithelial ovarian cancer, fallopian tube cancer, or primary peritoneal cancer. Mirvetuximab soravtansine is a folate receptor alpha directed antibody and microtubule inhibitor conjugate.

The most common adverse reactions, including laboratory abnormalities, were vision impairment, fatigue, increased aspartate aminotransferase, nausea, increased alanine aminotransferase, keratopathy, abdominal pain, decreased lymphocytes, peripheral neuropathy, diarrhea, decreased albumin, constipation, increased alkaline phosphatase, dry eye, decreased magnesium, decreased leukocytes, decreased neutrophils, and decreased hemoglobin.

Mirvetuximab soravtansine was approved for medical use in the United States in November 2022. The US Food and Drug Administration (FDA) considers it to be a first-in-class medication.

== Composition ==
Mirvetuximab soravtansine consists of a FRα-targeted antibody, a toxic payload, and a linker connecting the two. The antibody (mirvetuximab) is a monoclonal antibody of subtype IgG1. It is produced in CHO cells. The payload is DM4, a molecule in the maytansinoid family that works by disrupting a cells microtubules. The linker is sulfo-SPDB.

== Medical uses ==
Mirvetuximab soravtansine is indicated for the treatment of adults with folate receptor alpha (FRα) positive, platinum-resistant epithelial ovarian cancer, fallopian tube cancer, or primary peritoneal cancer, who have received one to three prior systemic treatment regimens. Recipients are selected for therapy based on an FDA-approved test.

== Adverse effects ==
The product labeling includes a boxed warning for ocular toxicity.

== Clinical development ==
Efficacy was evaluated in study 0417 (NCT04296890), a single-arm trial of 106 participants with FRα positive, platinum-resistant epithelial ovarian, fallopian tube, or primary peritoneal cancer. Participants were permitted to receive up to three prior lines of systemic therapy. All participants were required to have received bevacizumab. The trial enrolled participants whose tumors were positive for FRα expression as determined by the above assay. Participants were excluded if they had corneal disorders, ocular conditions requiring ongoing treatment, Grade >1 peripheral neuropathy, or noninfectious interstitial lung disease.

Efficacy was evaluated in study 0416 (MIRASOL, NCT04209855), a multicenter, open-label, active-controlled, randomized, two-arm trial in 453 participants with platinum-resistant epithelial ovarian, fallopian tube, or primary peritoneal cancer. Participants were permitted to receive up to three prior lines of systemic therapy. The trial enrolled participants whose tumors were positive for FRα expression as determined by the VENTANA FOLR1 (FOLR1-2.1) RxDx Assay. Participants were randomized (1:1) to receive mirvetuximab soravtansine-gynx 6 mg/kg (based on adjusted ideal body weight) as an intravenous infusion every 3 weeks or investigator's choice of chemotherapy (paclitaxel, pegylated liposomal doxorubicin, or topotecan) until disease progression or unacceptable toxicity. The results from this trial satisfy the post-marketing requirement of the previous accelerated approval for mirvetuximab soravtansine-gynx.

It was granted FDA accelerated approval on November 14, 2022, making it the first ADC with regulatory approval to treat ovarian cancer.

== Society and culture ==
=== Legal status ===
In September 2024, the Committee for Medicinal Products for Human Use of the European Medicines Agency adopted a positive opinion, recommending the granting of a marketing authorization for the medicinal product Elahere, intended for the treatment of adults with folate receptor-alpha (FRα) positive epithelial ovarian, fallopian tube and primary peritoneal cancer. The applicant for this medicinal product is AbbVie Deutschland GmbH & Co. KG. Mirvetuximab soravtansine was authorized for use in the European Union in November 2024.

=== Names ===
Mirvetuximab soravtansine is the international nonproprietary name (INN).
