= FOLR3 =

Protein-coding gene in the species Homo sapiens

Identifiers
- Aliases: FOLR3, FR-G, FR-gamma, gamma-hFR, folate receptor 3 (gamma), folate receptor 3, folate receptor gamma, FRgamma
- External IDs: OMIM: 602469; GeneCards: FOLR3

Gene location (Human)
Chr.	Chromosome 11 (human)
Band	11q13.4	Start	72,114,869 bp
Band	11q13.4	End	72,139,892 bp
RNA expression pattern
Bgee	Human / Mouse (ortholog); Top expressed in: granulocyte; blood; monocyte; bone marrow; stromal cell of endometrium; spleen; bone marrow cell; trabecular bone; human kidney; gonad / n/a; More reference expression data
BioGPS	n/a
Gene ontology
Molecular function	folic acid binding; signaling receptor activity
Cellular component	membrane; extrinsic component of membrane; extracellular region; specific granule lumen; tertiary granule lumen; anchored component of external side of plasma membrane
Biological process	folic acid transport; neutrophil degranulation; cell adhesion; fusion of sperm to egg plasma membrane involved in single fertilization; sperm-egg recognition
Sources:Amigo / QuickGO
Orthologs
Databases	NCBI: entry; OMA: entry
Species	Human	Mouse
Entrez	2352	n/a
Ensembl	ENSG00000110203	n/a
UniProt	P41439	n/a
RefSeq (mRNA)	NM_000804; NM_001318045	n/a
RefSeq (protein)	NP_000795; NP_001304974	n/a
Location (UCSC)	Chr 11: 72.11 – 72.14 Mb	n/a
PubMed search		n/a
- Wikidata
View/Edit Human

Folate receptor gamma is a protein that in humans is encoded by the FOLR3 gene. It is involved in up-take of folic acid.

== Gene location ==
The FOLR multi-gene family (FOLR1, FOLR2 and FOLR3) is localized to chromosome 11q13.3–q14.1, and encodes the gene products FRα, β and γ, respectively.

== Tissue distribution ==
FOLR3 is localized in haematopoietic tissue, such as spleen and bone marrow, and is present as a secretory protein. FOLR3 expresses in humans rather than mice and rats.

== Function ==
The FOLR3 gene is polymorphic due to a nonsense mutation resulting in a truncated protein; FRγ, which can bind folic acid. FOLR3 genes each consist of 5 exons, 4 introns and 1 promoter that encodes a single transcript.

== Clinical significance ==
Expression of FOLR3 is correlated more strongly with plasma homocysteine(Hcy) than FOLR1 and FOLR2. FOLR3 may decrease plasma Hcy compared with other FOLRs. It was demonstrated that FOLR3 can metabolize both intracellular Hcy and extracellular Hcy. These results indicate that an increase in FOLR3 may effectively ameliorate Hcy in the blood and weaken Hcy-induced toxicity, even in tissues with the low level of FOLR1 and FOLR2 expression.
