= Serous tumour =

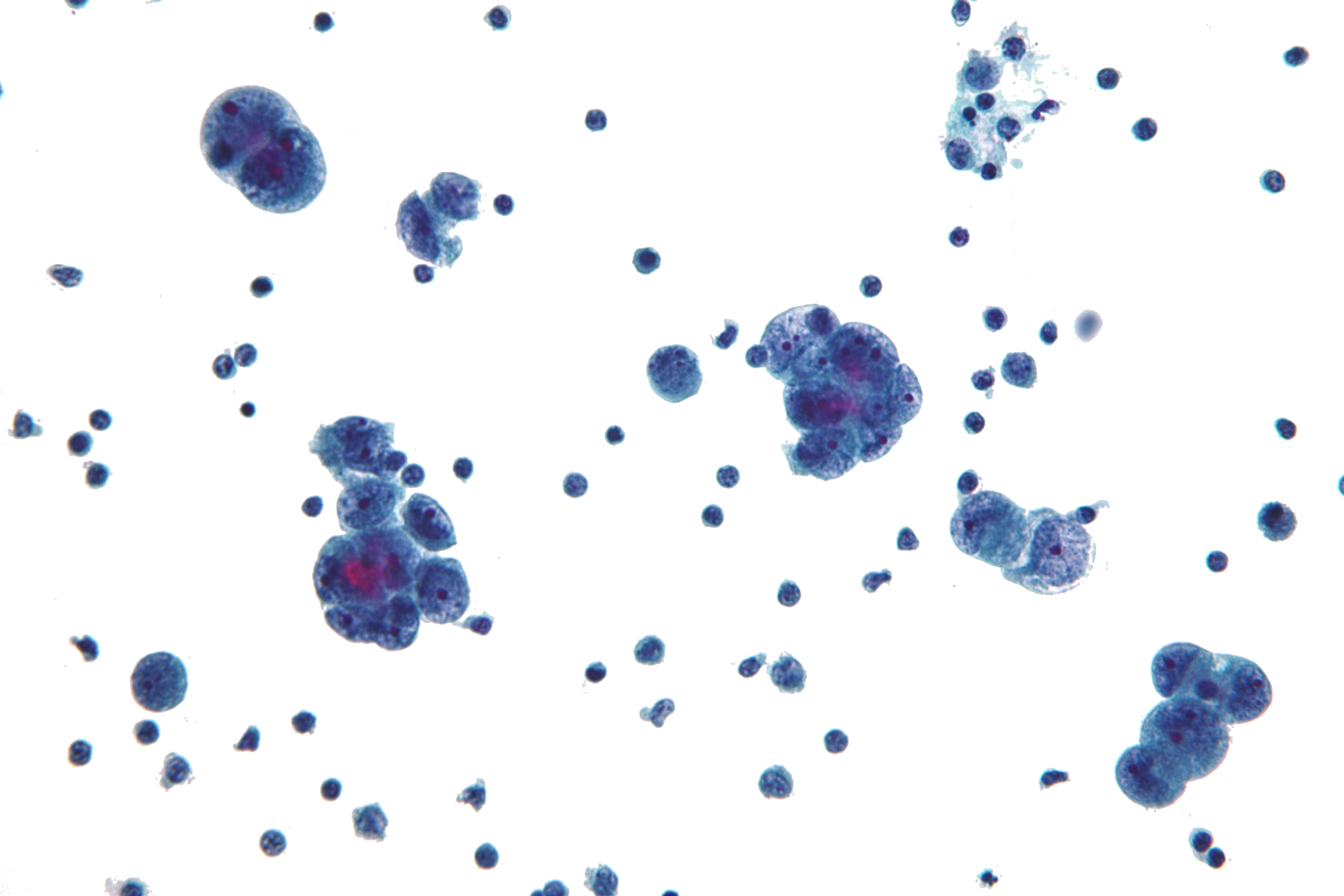
- Micrograph of serous carcinoma, a type of serous tumour.

A serous tumour is a neoplasm that typically has papillary to solid formations of tumor cells with crowded nuclei. They typically arise on the modified Müllerian-derived serous membranes that surround the ovaries in females. Such ovarian tumors are part of the surface epithelial-stromal tumour group of ovarian tumors. They are common neoplasms with a strong tendency to occur bilaterally, and they account for approximately a quarter of all ovarian tumors.

Rarely, serous tumors arise from other parts of the peritoneum, including serous primary peritoneal carcinomas. Even more rarely they arise in other body locations, such as the lungs. Despite the name, uterine serous carcinoma arises from the endometrium and not the serous membrane.

== Ovarian serous tumours ==
=== Low grade ===
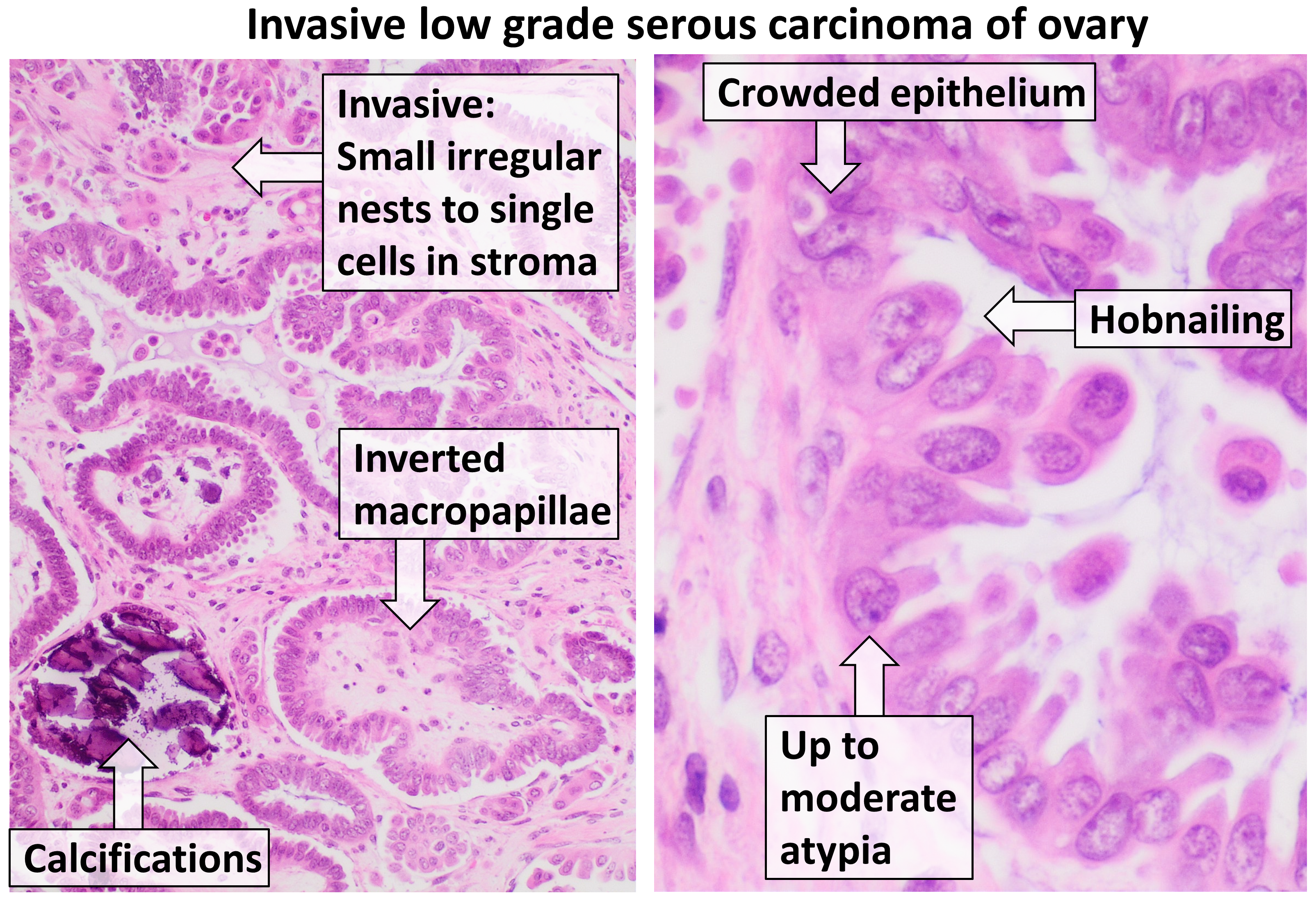
Histopathology of invasive low-grade serous carcinoma of ovary with typical features. H&E stain. The left image shows lower magnification, including inverted macropapillae which are with broad fibrovascular cores surrounded by clear (white) clefts. Invasion (characterized by small irregular nests to single cells) should be over 5 mm in size to distinguish it from a borderline serous tumor. Calcifications often form psammoma bodies. Right picture shows higher magnification, including hobnailing which is individual cells protruding into the lumen of glands. Cells may have up to moderate atypia: They may have conspicuous nucleoli, and up to 3x variation in nuclear sizes compared to each other. More atypical features indicate a high-grade serous carcinoma.

The "low grade" classification of serous tumors includes benign and borderline tumors, as well as low grade malignant tumors. Benign serous tumors are distinguished from borderline tumors by the absence of cellular stratification. Stromal invasion distinguishes borderline tumors from low grade malignant tumors. Surgery is curative for benign tumors, and likely curative for other low grade tumors.

Benign serous tumors include serous cystadenomas, cystadenofibromas, and adenofibromas. Benign and borderline serous tumours are commonly unilocular. Benign tumors contain clear fluid and have a smooth lining composed of columnar epithelial cells with cilia. On gross examination, the serous tumor may present as either a cystic lesion in which the papillary epithelium is contained within a few fibrous walled cysts, or the papillary projections may be away from the surface epithelium.

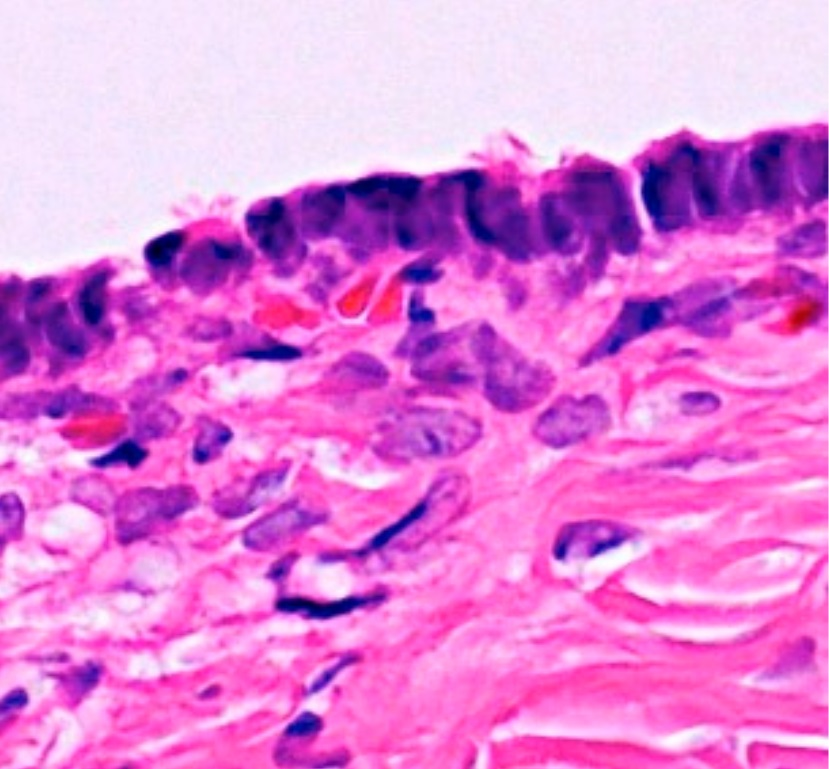
Histopathology of serous cystadenoma of the ovary, which is benign. It shows admixed scattered ciliated cells. This case closely resembles normal surface endometrial epithelium of the uterus.

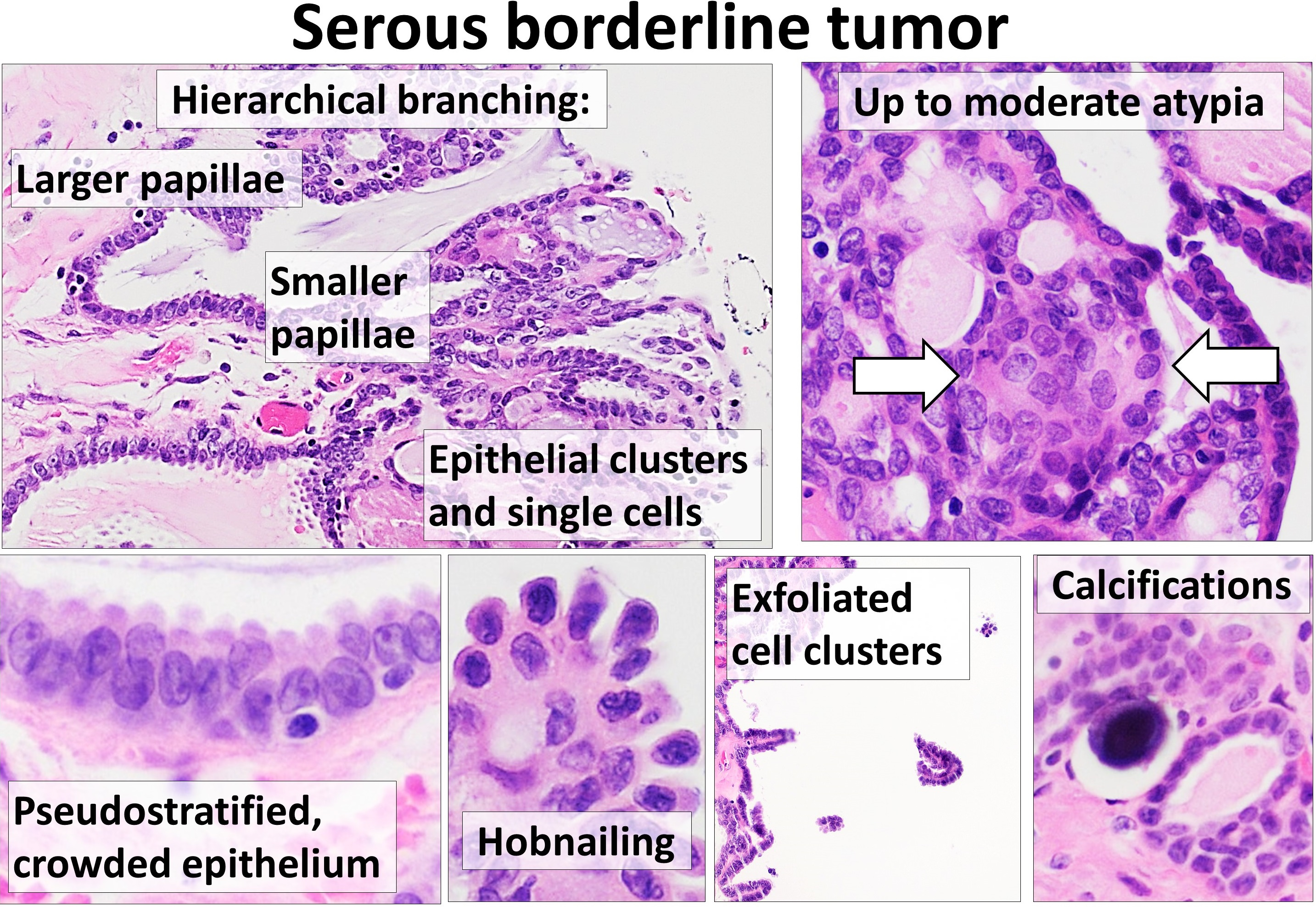
Histopathology of the typical features of an ovarian serous borderline tumor: Hierarchical branching, exfoliated cell clusters, calcifications, up to moderate atypia, and pseudostratified, crowded epithelium with hobnailing. H&E stain.

In borderline lesions, the cyst or surface is lined by papillary structures, which are often very complex. Microscopically, stromal papillae are covered by atypical epithelial cells, but stromal invasion is absent, and nuclear stratification is present. Approximately 15% of serous tumors are borderline.

In borderline tumors and low grade carcinomas, psammoma bodies are often found. Serous psammocarcinoma is a low grade variant in which massive psammoma bodies are present.

=== High grade ===
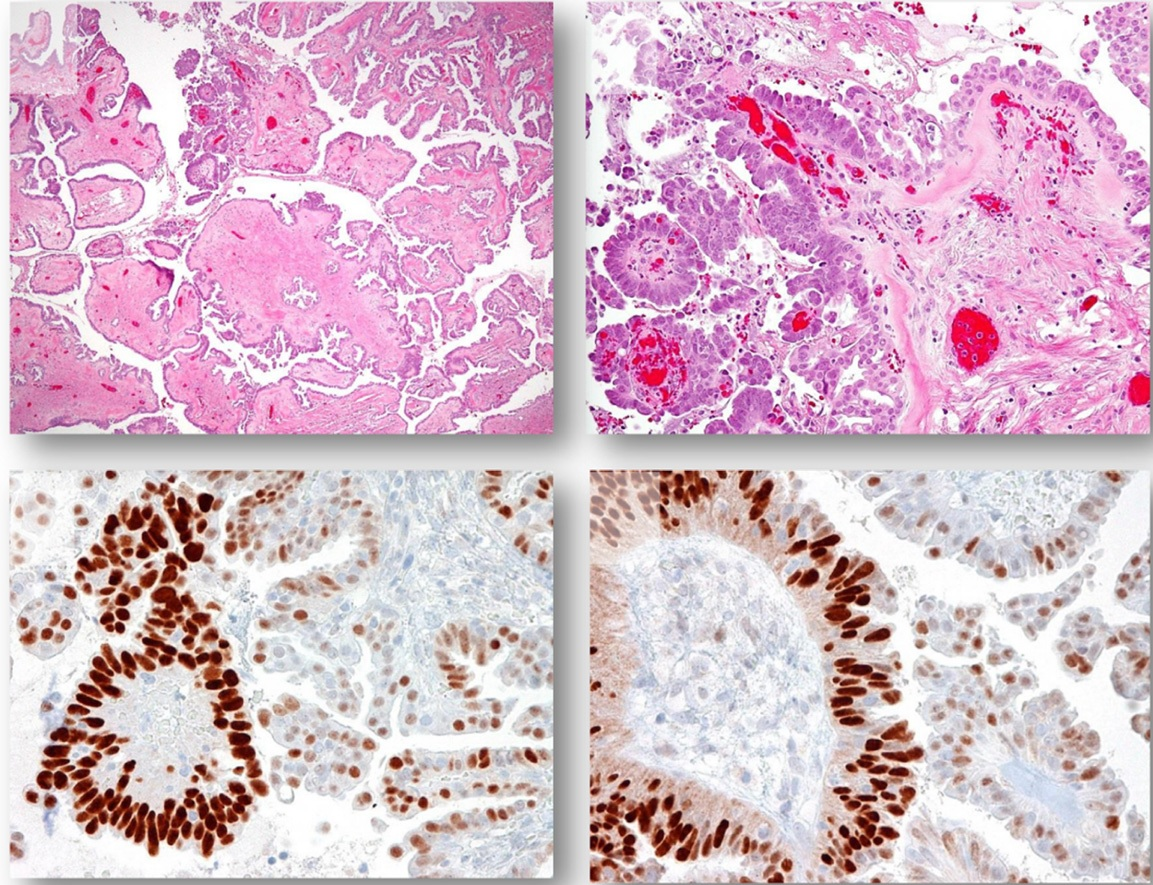
A high-grade serous carcinoma arising from a borderline serous tumor: A. Low-magnification view shows a focal high-grade serous carcinoma developing from the papillae (square) in a background of a typical serous borderline tumor. B. Higher magnification demonstrates enlarged and atypical high-grade serous carcinoma cells that organize in a papillary architecture. C and D. Immunohistochemistry of p53 shows that high-grade serous carcinoma cells are diffusely positive for p53, a pattern consistent with a missense TP53 mutation while the adjacent epithelial cells from the background serous borderline tumor are only focally and weakly positive, a pattern consistent with a wild-type TP53 sequence.

High grade serous tumors often involve both ovaries. The tumors are solid and cystic with haemorrhage and necrosis. They are morphologically heterogenous. Serous carcinomas often have bulky peritoneal and omental metastases, and spread to the lymph nodes is frequent.

Beginning in the year 2000, the fallopian tube, specifically the fimbriated end, has emerged as an origin for many "ovarian" high-grade serous carcinomas. This discovery has been facilitated by pathology dissection protocols such as the SEE-FIM Protocol, which play close attention to the distal fallopian tube and have revealed early serous cancers and precancers in this region.

Unsurprisingly, 5-year survival decreases as the stage increases. There is a 25% survival rate with a stage III serous carcinoma. Staging:

- Stage I - Tumour growth limited to ovaries.
- Stage II - Growth involving one or both ovaries with pelvic extension.
- Stage III - Tumour involving one or both ovaries with implants outside pelvis.
- Stage IV- Tumour involving one or both ovaries with presence of distant metastasis.

=== Epidemiology ===
25% of ovarian tumors and 40% of ovarian cancers are serous tumors. Family history and nulliparity have been identified as risk factors for the disease.

== Pancreatic serous cystadenoma ==
Pancreatic serous cystadenoma is a benign tumour of the pancreas. It is usually solitary and found in the body or tail of the pancreas, and may be associated with von Hippel–Lindau syndrome.

== Uterine serous carcinoma ==
Uterine serous carcinoma is an uncommon form of endometrial cancer that typically arises in postmenopausal women.

Despite the name, it is a cancer of the endometrium, which is the inner layer of the uterus; and not of the serous membrane that forms the outer layer of the uterus. The name arises from its histological similarity to serous ovarian cancer.

It is typically diagnosed on endometrial biopsy, prompted by post-menopausal bleeding. Unlike the more common low-grade endometrioid endometrial adenocarcinoma, uterine serous carcinoma does not develop from endometrial hyperplasia and is not hormone-sensitive. It arises in the setting of endometrial atrophy and is classified as a type II endometrial cancer.
