= Pafolacianine =

Fluorescent drug

Clinical data
- Trade names: Cytalux
- Other names: OTL38, OTL-0038
- License data: US DailyMed: Pafolacianine
- Pregnancy category: Not recommended
- Routes of administration: Intravenous
- ATC code: V04CX10 (WHO)

Legal status
- Legal status: US: ℞-only

Identifiers
- IUPAC name: 2-{(E)-2-[(3E)-2-(4-{2-[(4-{[(2-Amino-4-oxo-3,4-dihydro-6-pteridinyl)methyl]aminobenzoyl)amino]-2-carboxyethyl}}phenoxy)-3-{(2E)-2-[3,3-dimethyl-5-sulfo-1-(4-sulfobutyl)-1,3-dihydro-2H-indol-2-ylidene]ethylidene}-1-cyclohexen-1-yl]vinyl}-3,3-dimethyl-1-(4-sulfobutyl)-3H-indolium-5-sulfonate
- CAS Number: 1628423-76-6
- PubChem CID: 135565623
- DrugBank: DB15413
- ChemSpider: 64880249
- UNII: F7BD3Z4X8L
- KEGG: D12249
- ChEMBL: ChEMBL4297412

Chemical and physical data
- Formula: C_{61}H_{67}N_{9}O_{17}S_{4}
- Molar mass: 1326.49 g·mol^{−1}
- 3D model (JSmol): Interactive image
- SMILES: CC1(C2=C(C=CC(=C2)S(=O)(=O)[O-])[N+](=C1C=CC3=C(C(=CC=C4C(C5=C(N4CCCCS(=O)(=O)O)C=CC(=C5)S(=O)(=O)O)(C)C)CCC3)OC6=CC=C(C=C6)CC(C(=O)O)NC(=O)C7=CC=C(C=C7)NCC8=CN=C9C(=N8)C(=O)NC(=N9)N)CCCCS(=O)(=O)O)C
- InChI: InChI=1S/C61H67N9O17S4/c1-60(2)46-33-44(90(81,82)83)22-24-49(46)69(28-5-7-30-88(75,76)77)51(60)26-16-38-10-9-11-39(17-27-52-61(3,4)47-34-45(91(84,85)86)23-25-50(47)70(52)29-6-8-31-89(78,79)80)54(38)87-43-20-12-37(13-21-43)32-48(58(73)74)66-56(71)40-14-18-41(19-15-40)63-35-42-36-64-55-53(65-42)57(72)68-59(62)67-55/h12-27,33-34,36,48H,5-11,28-32,35H2,1-4H3,(H9-,62,63,64,66,67,68,71,72,73,74,75,76,77,78,79,80,81,82,83,84,85,86)/t48-/m0/s1; Key:PDXNSXLPXJFETD-DYVQZXGMSA-N

Pafolacianine, sold under the brand name Cytalux, is an optical imaging agent used in fluorescence-guided surgery. Pafolacianine is a fluorescent medication that binds to folate receptor (FR)-expressing cells.

The most common side effects of pafolacianine include infusion-related reactions, including nausea, vomiting, abdominal pain, flushing, dyspepsia, chest discomfort, itching and hypersensitivity.

It was approved for medical use in the United States in November 2021. The U.S. Food and Drug Administration considers it to be a first-in-class medication.

== Medical uses ==
Pafolacianine is indicated as an adjunct for intraoperative identification of malignant lesions in people with ovarian cancer. It is also indicated to assist identifying lung cancer lesions in adults with known or suspected lung cancer.

== History ==
Scientists from Purdue University designed and developed OTL38 and licensed it to On Target Laboratories in 2013. The safety and effectiveness of pafolacianine was evaluated in a randomized, multi-center, open-label study of women diagnosed with ovarian cancer or with high clinical suspicion of ovarian cancer who were scheduled to undergo surgery. Of the 134 women (ages 33 to 81 years) who received a dose of pafolacianine and were evaluated under both normal and fluorescent light during surgery, 26.9% had at least one cancerous lesion detected that was not observed by standard visual or tactile inspection.

The safety and effectiveness of pafolacianine was evaluated in a randomized, multicenter, open-label study (NCT04241315) of participants with known or suspected lung cancer who were scheduled to undergo surgery. Of the 110 participants who received a dose of pafolacianine and were evaluated under both normal and fluorescent light during surgery, 24% had at least one cancerous lesion detected that was not observed by standard visual or tactile inspection.

The U.S. Food and Drug Administration (FDA) granted the application for pafolacianine orphan drug, priority review, and fast track designations. The FDA granted the approval of Cytalux to On Target Laboratories, LLC.

== Figures ==
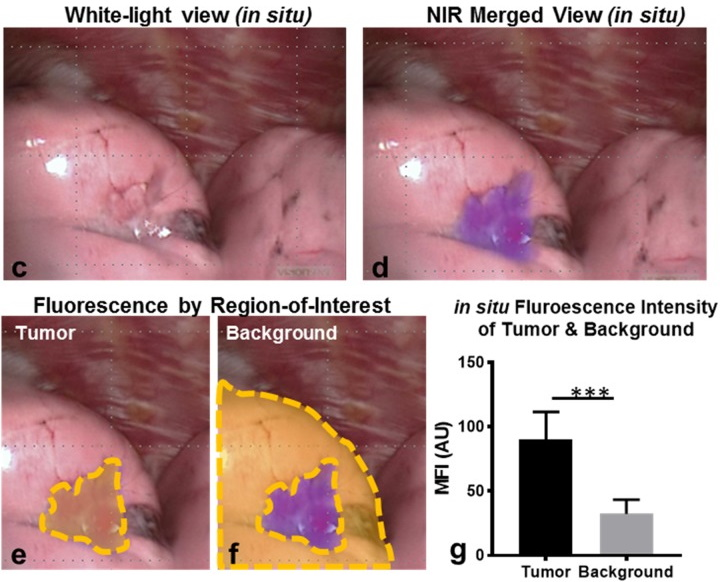
Intraoperative imaging of a squamous cell carcinoma of the lung with OTL38, subsequently renamed pafolacianine. From Predina et al., 2018.
