= Small molecule drug conjugate =

Small molecule drug conjugates or SMDCs are built with three modules: a targeting ligand, a linker and a drug payload. The targeting ligands consist of low molecular weight, high-affinity ligands that are precisely linked to potent drugs. The linkers are designed to be stable in the bloodstream and then release the active drug from the targeting ligand when the SMDC is taken up by the diseased cell. The drug payloads are highly active molecules that either have poor bioavailability when administered in the unmodified form, or are too toxic to be administered in their untargeted forms at therapeutic dose levels. This modular approach allows varying targeting ligands, linker systems and drug payloads and generate SMDCs for different diseases. The most advanced SMDC is vintafolide, a derivative of the anti-mitotic chemotherapy drug vinblastine which is chemically linked to folic acid. Potent, bioactive natural products like triptolide that inhibit mammalian transcription has been recently reported as a glucose conjugate for targeting hypoxic cancer cells with increased glucose transporter expression.

SMDCs are currently being developed by Endocyte for treating cancer, inflammatory diseases and kidney disease, as well as a companion imaging agent that is created by replacing the potent drug with an imaging agent.

== See also ==
- Codrug
