= Folate receptor 1 =

Protein found in humans

FOLR1

Identifiers
- Aliases: FOLR1, FBP, FOLR, Folate receptor 1, folate receptor 1 (adult), folate receptor alpha, FRalpha, NCFTD
- External IDs: OMIM: 136430; MGI: 95568; GeneCards: FOLR1
Available structures
PDB	Ortholog search: PDBe RCSB
PDB	List of PDB id codes 4KM6, 4KM7, 4KMX, 4LRH

Gene location (Human)
Chr.	Chromosome 11 (human)
Band	11q13.4	Start	72,189,558 bp
Band	11q13.4	End	72,196,323 bp

Gene location (Mouse)
Chr.	Chromosome 7 (mouse)
Band	7|7 E2	Start	101,507,538 bp
Band	7|7 E2	End	101,519,995 bp
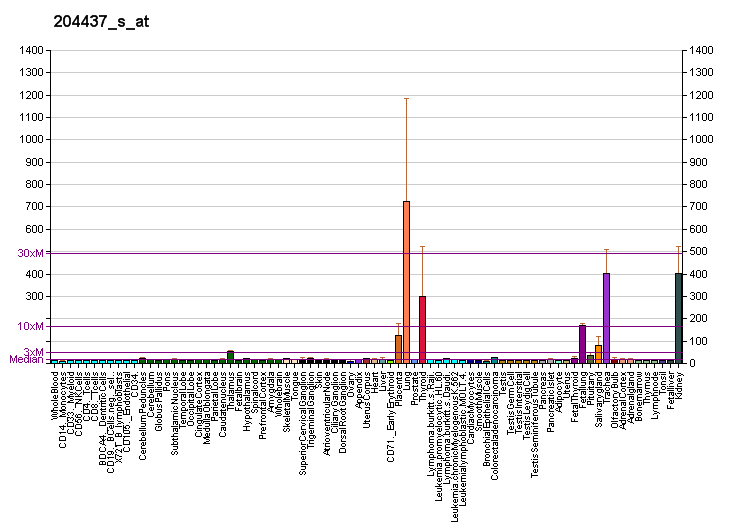
RNA expression pattern
Bgee	Human / Mouse (ortholog); Top expressed in: right uterine tube; parotid gland; right lung; lower lobe of lung; upper lobe of lung; upper lobe of left lung; human kidney; olfactory zone of nasal mucosa; trachea; bronchial epithelial cell / Top expressed in: choroid plexus of fourth ventricle; right kidney; epithelium of lens; Epithelium of choroid plexus; yolk sac; human kidney; morula; morula; proximal tubule; parotid gland; More reference expression data
BioGPS	More reference expression data
Gene ontology
Molecular function	methotrexate binding; folic acid receptor activity; folic acid transmembrane transporter activity; folic acid binding; signaling receptor activity
Cellular component	anchored component of external side of plasma membrane; extracellular region; brush border; clathrin-coated vesicle; ER to Golgi transport vesicle membrane; anchored component of membrane; Golgi membrane; nucleus; integral component of plasma membrane; apical plasma membrane; membrane; cell surface; endoplasmic reticulum membrane; brush border membrane; basolateral plasma membrane; plasma membrane; cytoplasmic vesicle; endosome; endoplasmic reticulum-Golgi intermediate compartment membrane; anchored component of plasma membrane; extracellular exosome; transport vesicle
Biological process	receptor-mediated endocytosis; cellular response to folic acid; neural crest cell migration involved in heart formation; axon regeneration; COPII vesicle coating; endoplasmic reticulum to Golgi vesicle-mediated transport; heart looping; cardiac neural crest cell migration involved in outflow tract morphogenesis; pharyngeal arch artery morphogenesis; folic acid metabolic process; regulation of transforming growth factor beta receptor signaling pathway; response to axon injury; regulation of canonical Wnt signaling pathway; anterior neural tube closure; folic acid transport; transport; folate import across plasma membrane
Sources:Amigo / QuickGO
Orthologs
Databases	NCBI: entry; OMA: entry
Species	Human	Mouse
Entrez	2348	14275
Ensembl	ENSG00000110195	ENSMUSG00000001827
UniProt	P15328	P35846
RefSeq (mRNA)	NM_016730; NM_000802; NM_016724; NM_016725; NM_016729	NM_001252552; NM_001252553; NM_001252554; NM_008034
RefSeq (protein)	NP_000793; NP_057936; NP_057937; NP_057941	NP_001239481; NP_001239482; NP_001239483; NP_032060
Location (UCSC)	Chr 11: 72.19 – 72.2 Mb	Chr 7: 101.51 – 101.52 Mb
PubMed search
- Wikidata
View/Edit Human	View/Edit Mouse

Folate receptor 1 (Folate receptor alpha, FOLR1) is a protein that in humans is encoded by the FOLR1 gene.

The protein encoded by this gene is a member of the folate receptor (FOLR) family. Members of this family have a high affinity for folic acid and for several reduced folic acid derivatives, and mediate delivery of 5-methyltetrahydrofolate to the interior of cells.

== Functions ==
This receptor is responsible for binding to folic acid and its derivatives, which becomes crucial during fetal development. By adding folate supplementation during pregnancy, neural tube defects in the fetus are prevented. Folate derivatives are necessary for important metabolic processes such as DNA, protein and lipid methylation. More importantly, folate plays a major role in DNA replication and cell division, which are common characteristics of rapid growth. Even though it is unclear how folate affects neural tube formation, scientists are certain that without appropriate folate levels, neural tube defects can develop through human and mice studies. Neural tube defects refer to the improper development of the neural tube by not being sealed correctly. This results in exencephaly or spina bifida, both nervous system abnormalities.

This gene is composed of 7 exons; exons 1 through 4 encode the 5' UTR and exons 4 through 7 encode the open reading frame. Due to the presence of 2 promoters, multiple transcription start sites, and alternative splicing of exons, several transcript variants are derived from this gene. These variants differ in the lengths of 5' and 3' UTR, but they encode an identical amino acid sequence.

== Clinical significance ==
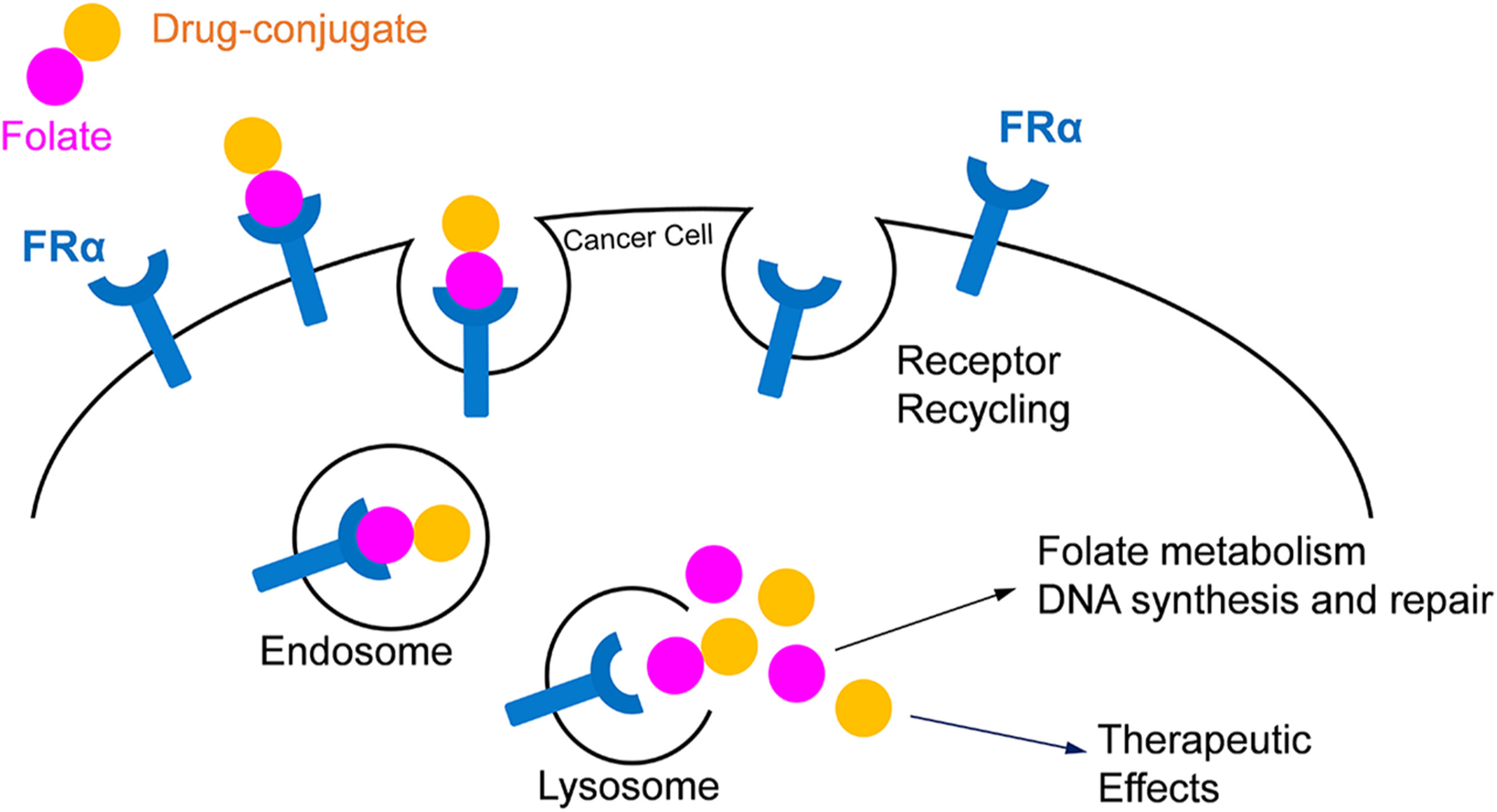
Schematic model of FRα used as a target in cancer therapy.

FRα, due to its high expression in some tumors, is an attractive therapeutic target for the development of novel anti-cancer agents in order to limit toxic side-effects on off-target tissues.

FRa can be overexpressed by a number of epithelial-derived tumors including ovarian, breast, renal, lung, colorectal, and brain. According to a review published in 2020, elevated expression of FRa was noted in mesotheliomas (72-100% of cases), triple-negative breast cancer (35-68% of cases) and epithelial ovarian cancer (76-89% of cases).

Therefore, antibodies to FRa are being developed for use in targeted therapies, with examples like Farletuzumab, Sofetabart mipitecan in phase III trials for ovarian cancer. Further, FRa-binding markers have been created in an attempt to visualise FRa-expressing tumors. In 2021, the fluorescent marker pafolacianine was approved for identification of malignant lesions during surgeries. Mirvetuximab soravtansine-gynx/Elahere is an ADC that was approved in 2022 by FDA for the treatment of platinum-resistant epithelial ovarian carcinoma.

Autoantibodies to the FRA have been linked to neurodevelopmental diseases, particularly cerebral folate deficiency schizophrenia and autism spectrum disorder. Recent studies have shown that these neurodevelopmental disorders can be treated with folinic acid.

Other ligands, based on folate, can also be used for diagnostic imaging, including DMTHF-Tc.

== Figures ==
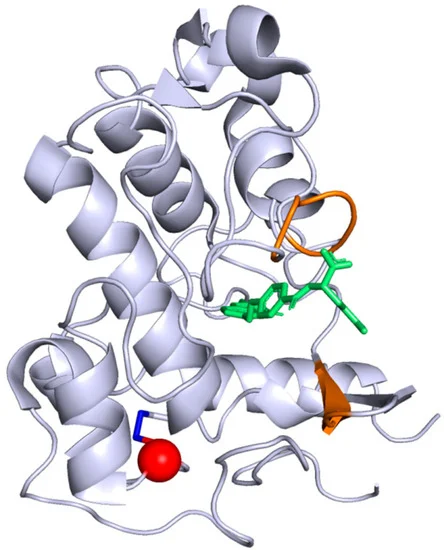
Crystallographic structure of FRα protein. The folate is in green, the folate binding site is colored in orange. A Cys66Tyr substitution position induced by a pathogenic variant is represented in red while the disulfide bond between Cys66 and Cys109 is in dark blue. Figure from Mafi et al., 2020

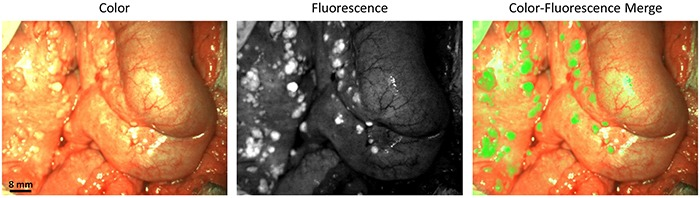
Identification of ovarian cancer metastases located on the intestine and mesentery using fluorescence imaging of the folate receptor alpha-binding marker EC17. From Tummers et al., 2016.

== See also ==
- SLC19A1
- ONX-0801
