= Folate targeting =

Folate targeting is a method utilized in biotechnology for drug delivery purposes. This Trojan Horse process, which was created by Drs. Christopher P. Leamon and Philip S. Low, involves the attachment of the vitamin, folate (folic acid), to a molecule/drug to form a "folate conjugate". Based on the natural high affinity of folate for the folate receptor protein (FR), which is commonly expressed on the surface of many human cancers, folate-drug conjugates also bind tightly to the FR and trigger cellular uptake via endocytosis. Molecules as diverse as small radiodiagnostic imaging agents to large DNA plasmid formulations have successfully been delivered inside FR-positive cells and tissues.

== Background ==
Folic acid (FA, folate or vitamin B_{9}), is a vital nutrient required by all living cells for nucleotide biosynthesis and for the proper metabolic maintenance of 1-carbon pathways. Aside from its cofactor role for intracellular enzymes, FA also displays high affinity for the folate receptor (FR), a glycosylphosphatidylinositol-linked protein that captures its ligands from the extracellular milieu and transports them inside the cell via a non-destructive, recycling endosomal pathway. The FR is also a recognized tumor antigen/biomarker. Because of this, diagnostic and therapeutic methods which exploit the FR's function are being developed for cancer.

The FR is an emerging therapeutic target for diagnosis and treatment of cancer and chronic inflammatory diseases. Expression of the FR is selectively upregulated on certain malignant cells and activated macrophages. Overexpression of the FR on these types of cells is clinically significant because they designate areas where the physiological symptoms of disease are most extensive. The malignant cells indicate the presence of tumors associated with ovarian, lung, breast, kidney, brain, endometrial, and colon cancer. Macrophages become activated in chronic diseases such as rheumatoid arthritis, Crohn's disease, ulcerative colitis, psoriasis, atherosclerosis, diabetes, and most other inflammatory diseases.

From a mechanistic perspective, the FR functions to concentrate exogenous ligands (e.g. folates and folate-drug conjugates) into the cell cytosol by endocytosis. The term endocytosis refers to the process whereby the plasma membrane invaginates and eventually forms a distinct intracellular compartment. The endocytic vesicles (endosomes) rapidly become acidified to allow the FR to release its ligand. Afterwards, the empty FR returns to the cell surface where it can participate in another round of ligand-mediated endocytosis.

The discovery of vitamin-mediated drug targeting in plants led to the hypothesis that folate-targeted therapies could be of clinical use. After proteins covalently bonded to biotin were successfully transported into plant cells through receptor-mediated endocytosis, a similar technique was attempted with folate and animal cells. Targeted drug therapy is advantageous because it deposits the drug at the specific location where it can be most useful in treating the disease. Similarly, folate-targeted imaging therapy helps visualize areas where the FR is expressed at higher levels. With greater control over where exogenous agents are delivered, diagnostic and treatment therapies are more effective and cause fewer side effects.

== Methods of drug delivery ==
Specificity of folate conjugates for the FR has been shown by competition tests with free folate. When this ligand, known to bind the FR, is added in excess of the folate conjugate, it outcompetes the conjugate, indicating that the folate conjugate specifically binds the FR, and not other receptors, in the process of receptor-mediated endocytosis. Addition of an enzyme that frees the folate receptor from the cell membrane and addition of antibodies to the FR also reverse the internalization of folate conjugates, providing further evidence that folate conjugates bind the FR with specificity.

While some drugs and radioimaging agents are delivered to cells as folate conjugates in a one-to-one folate-to-conjugate ratio, folate-targeted liposomes allow for the delivery of larger amounts of chemotherapeutic agents. In this technique, drug particles are enveloped in a plasma membrane-bound vesicle. Folate is attached to polyethylene glycol bound to the phosphate heads of membrane phospholipids, thus directing the liposomes to FRs of tumor cells, by which they are engulfed.

== FR-positive cancer ==
Elevated expression of the FR occurs in many human malignancies, especially when associated with aggressively growing cancers. Recently, it was proposed that this relationship may possibly be used for prognostic purposes. Non-mucinous ovarian cancer (the majority of ovarian cancers) was the first tumor type to be associated with FR "over-expression", and it was later shown that this antigen was identical to that found on KB tumor cells and in placental tissue. Several studies confirmed that ~80-90% of ovarian tumors over-express the FR. Other gynecological cancers also over-express the receptor as well as pediatric ependymal brain tumors, mesothelioma, and breast, colon, renal and lung tumors. The FR may also be found associated with cancer, particularly when related to myeloid leukemia and perhaps head and neck carcinomas. Taken together, the total number of tumors that express the FR is very large; therefore, FR-targeted strategies could have significant impact on cancer treatment for patients diagnosed with FR-positive disease.

== Diagnostics ==
The FR is expressed on many different types of malignant tissues and in large quantities. But, not all human cancers within a particular indication will express the FR. Because novel FR-targeted therapies are now being tested clinically, having the ability to screen patients for FR-positive disease could certainly increase the efficiency of and decrease the time for clinical investigations of these novel agents.

Currently, there are two principal methods that have been utilized for assessing a patient's "FR status". These include an invasive tissue-based immunohistochemical assay, and a non-invasive radiodiagnostic approach. The latter method is now being tested clinically using ^{99m}Tc-EC20.

== Folate-targeted chemotherapy ==
To date, four distinct FA-drug conjugates have entered clinical trials for the treatment of cancer:

Vintafolide (EC145) represents a novel water-soluble FA conjugate of the powerful microtubule destabilizing agent, desacetylvinblastine monohydrazide (DAVLBH; a derivative of the natural product, vinblastine). EC145 was found to produce marked anti-tumor effect against well-established, subcutaneous FR-positive tumor xenografts using well tolerated regimens. EC145 also represents the first FA-drug conjugate to be evaluated in clinical trials, and it is currently (2009) being tested in a multi-national randomized Phase 2b trial in combination with pegylated liposomal doxorubicin (Doxil).

EC0225 represents the "first in class" multi-drug, FA-targeted agent to be reported. It is a molecule constructed with a single FA moiety and extended by a hydrophilic peptide-based spacer that is, in turn, linked to Vinca alkaloid and mitomycin units via 2 distinct disulfide-containing linkers. Animals bearing well-established human tumor xenografts were found to completely respond to EC0225 therapy with dosing regimens that were approximately 3-fold less intensive to that required for EC145. A Phase 1 trial for EC0225 is in progress.

BMS-753493 is a molecule born from a collaboration between scientists at Endocyte Inc. and Bristol Myers Squibb (BMS). It represents a FA conjugate that was constructed with a semi-synthetic analog of Epothilone A. BMS-753493 is currently being evaluated for safety and efficacy in Phase 2 clinical trials sponsored by BMS.

EC0489 is the latest folate-targeted chemotherapeutic to enter clinical trials sponsored by Endocyte. This molecule is actually a derivative of EC145 (see above) that was designed to have limited non-specific clearance properties through the liver. By reducing hepatic clearance, less drug will transit through the biliary excretion route; as a consequence, less off-target toxicities (predicted from preclinical tests) are expected.

== Activated macrophage targeting ==
Macrophages are the human body's first line of defense against invading pathogens. Normally, they circulate in the bloodstream in a dormant state, but at a site of inflammation due to injury or autoimmune disease, they become activated, changing shape and expressing different cell surface markers. The upregulated expression of the FR makes activated macrophages a useful tool in folate-targeted therapy. Activated, TNF-alpha producing macrophages express the beta isoform of the FR, and they are targetable with folate conjugates in vivo. For example, ^{99m}Tc-EC20 was reported to concentrate in the livers, spleens and arthritic extremities of adjuvant-induced arthritic rats via a folate-dependent mechanism. Development of folate-drug conjugates for inflammation therapy is underway. It is expected that ailments which harbor activated macrophages (such as arthritis, psoriasis and inflammatory bowel disease) may someday be treatable with folate-targeted medicines.
