= FOLR2 =

Protein-coding gene in the species Homo sapiens

Identifiers
- Aliases: FOLR2, BETA-HFR, FBP, FBP/PL-1, FR-BETA, FR-P3, folate receptor beta, FRbeta, FOLR1
- External IDs: OMIM: 136425; MGI: 95569; GeneCards: FOLR2
Available structures
PDB	Ortholog search: PDBe RCSB
PDB	List of PDB id codes 4KMY, 4KMZ, 4KN0, 4KN1, 4KN2

Gene location (Human)
Chr.	Chromosome 11 (human)
Band	11q13.4	Start	72,216,601 bp
Band	11q13.4	End	72,221,950 bp

Gene location (Mouse)
Chr.	Chromosome 7 (mouse)
Band	7|7 E2	Start	101,489,195 bp
Band	7|7 E2	End	101,506,401 bp
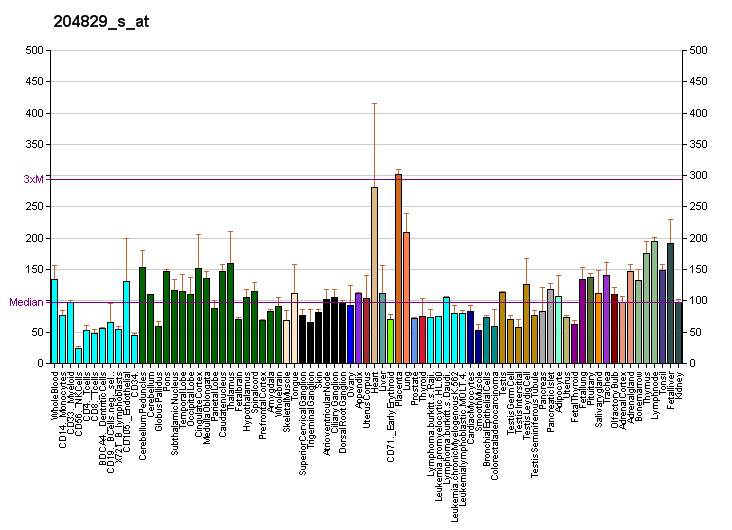
RNA expression pattern
Bgee	Human / Mouse (ortholog); Top expressed in: gallbladder; right coronary artery; synovial joint; lymph node; synovial membrane; gonad; pericardium; decidua; testicle; rectum / Top expressed in: stroma of bone marrow; lip; ankle joint; white adipose tissue; esophagus; muscle of thigh; ankle; mammary gland; subcutaneous adipose tissue; morula; More reference expression data
BioGPS	More reference expression data
Gene ontology
Molecular function	methotrexate binding; folic acid binding; folic acid receptor activity; signaling receptor activity
Cellular component	cell surface; anchored component of membrane; anchored component of external side of plasma membrane; membrane; extracellular region; plasma membrane
Biological process	inflammatory response; receptor-mediated endocytosis; positive regulation of cell population proliferation; monocyte chemotaxis; cellular response to folic acid; folic acid metabolic process; folic acid transport; folate import across plasma membrane; cell adhesion; fusion of sperm to egg plasma membrane involved in single fertilization; sperm-egg recognition
Sources:Amigo / QuickGO
Orthologs
Databases	NCBI: entry; OMA: entry
Species	Human	Mouse
Entrez	2350	14276
Ensembl	ENSG00000165457	ENSMUSG00000032725
UniProt	P14207	Q05685
RefSeq (mRNA)	NM_000803; NM_001113534; NM_001113535; NM_001113536	NM_008035; NM_001303231; NM_001303239
RefSeq (protein)	NP_000794; NP_001107006; NP_001107007; NP_001107008	NP_001290160; NP_001290168; NP_032061
Location (UCSC)	Chr 11: 72.22 – 72.22 Mb	Chr 7: 101.49 – 101.51 Mb
PubMed search
- Wikidata
View/Edit Human	View/Edit Mouse

Folate receptor beta is a protein that in humans is encoded by the FOLR2 gene.

The protein encoded by this gene is a member of the folate receptor (FOLR) family. Members of this gene family have a high affinity for folic acid and for several reduced folic acid derivatives, and mediate delivery of 5-methyltetrahydrofolate to the interior of cells. This protein has a 68% and 79% sequence identity with the FOLR1 and FOLR3 proteins, respectively. The FOLR2 protein was originally thought to exist only in placenta, but is also detected in spleen, bone marrow, and thymus.
