= Marketing authorisation application =

Application to market a new drug in Europe

Marketing authorisation application (MAA) is an application submitted by a drug manufacturer seeking marketing authorisation, that is permission to bring a medicinal product (for example, a new medicine or generic medicine) to the market.

MAA is part of the official procedure before the Medicines and Healthcare products Regulatory Agency in the United Kingdom and the Committee for Medicinal Products for Human Use of the European Medicines Agency, a specialised agency of the European Commission. A centralised marketing authorisation, issued by the European Commission, allows the holder to market a medicinal product throughout the European Economic Area, which comprises the EU Member States, Iceland, Norway and Liechtenstein.

In the United States, the equivalent process is called New Drug Application.
