= Folate receptor =

Folate receptor family

Identifiers
- Symbol: Folate_rec
- Pfam: PF03024
- InterPro: IPR004269
Available protein structures:
- PDB: IPR004269 PF03024 (ECOD; PDBsum)
- AlphaFold: IPR004269; PF03024

Folate receptors bind folate and reduced folic acid derivatives and mediate delivery of tetrahydrofolate to the interior of cells. It is then converted from monoglutamate to polyglutamate forms - such as 5-methyltetrahydrofolate - as only monoglutamate forms can be transported across cell membranes. Polyglutamate forms are biologically active enzymatic cofactors required for many folate-dependent processes such as folate-dependent one-carbon metabolism. These proteins are attached to the membrane by a GPI anchor. A riboflavin-binding protein required for the transport of riboflavin to the developing oocyte in chicken also belong to this family.

Human proteins from this family include:

- FOLR1: folate receptor 1 (adult),
- FOLR2: folate receptor 2 (fetal), and
- FOLR3: folate receptor gamma.
