= List of MeSH codes (C12) =

The following is a partial list of the "C" codes for Medical Subject Headings (MeSH), as defined by the United States National Library of Medicine (NLM).

This list continues the information at List of MeSH codes (C11). Codes following these are found at List of MeSH codes (C13). For other MeSH codes, see List of MeSH codes.

The source for this content is the set of 2006 MeSH Trees from the NLM.

== MeSH C12 – Urogenital Diseases ==
Pathological processes of the URINARY TRACT and the reproductive system (GENITALIA).

=== MeSH C12.050 – female urogenital diseases and pregnancy complications ===
==== MeSH C12.050.351 - female urogenital diseases ====
- MeSH C12.050.351.500 - genital diseases, female
- MeSH C12.050.351.500.056 - adnexal diseases
- MeSH C12.050.351.500.320 - gynatresia
- MeSH C12.050.351.500.342 – genitals, herpes
- MeSH C12.050.351.500.056.390 - fallopian tube diseases
- MeSH C12.050.351.500.056.390.390 - fallopian tube neoplasms
- MeSH C12.050.351.500.056.390.890 - salpingitis
- MeSH C12.050.351.500.056.630 - diseases, ovarian
- MeSH C12.050.351.500.056.630.050 - anovulation
- MeSH C12.050.351.500.056.630.250 - menopause, premature
- MeSH C12.050.351.500.056.630.450 - oophoritis
- MeSH C12.050.351.500.056.630.580 - cysts, ovarian
- MeSH C12.050.351.500.056.630.580.765 - polyendocrine metabolic ovarian syndrome
- MeSH C12.050.351.500.056.630.642 - syndrome, ovarian hyperstimulation
- MeSH C12.050.351.500.056.630.705 - neoplasms, ovarian
- MeSH C12.050.351.500.056.630.705.265 - brenner tumor
- MeSH C12.050.351.500.056.630.705.331 - carcinoma, endometrioid
- MeSH C12.050.351.500.056.630.705.350 - carcinoma, ovarian epithelial
- MeSH C12.050.351.500.056.630.705.398 - tumor, granulosa cell
- MeSH C12.050.351.500.056.630.705.431 - syndrome, hereditary breast and ovarian cancer
- MeSH C12.050.351.500.056.630.705.464 - luteoma
- MeSH C12.050.351.500.056.630.705.531 - syndrome, meigs
- MeSH C12.050.351.500.056.630.705.648 – tumor, sertoli-leydig cell
- MeSH C12.050.351.500.056.630.705.765 - thecoma
- MeSH C12.050.351.500.056.630.728 - ovarian, torsion
- MeSH C12.050.351.500.056.630.750 - primary ovarian insufficiency
- MeSH C12.050.351.500.056.750 - inflammatory disease, pelvic
- MeSH C12.050.351.500.056.750.249 - endometritis
- MeSH C12.050.351.500.056.750.500 - oophoritis
- MeSH C12.050.351.500.056.750.750 - parametritis
- MeSH C12.050.351.500.056.750.875 - salpingitis
- MeSH C12.050.351.500.110 - dyspareunia
- MeSH C12.050.351.500.242 – genital neoplasms, female
- MeSH C12.050.351.500.498 – infertility, female
- MeSH C12.050.351.500.630 - infections, reproductive tract
- MeSH C12.050.351.500.758 – tuberculosis, female genital
- MeSH C12.050.351.500.852 - uterine diseases
- MeSH C12.050.351.500.852.113 - adenomyosis
- MeSH C12.050.351.500.852.228 - endometrial hyperplasia
- MeSH C12.050.351.500.852.299 - endometritis
- MeSH C12.050.351.500.852.495 - hematometra
- MeSH C12.050.351.500.852.544 - pyometra
- MeSH C12.050.351.500.852.593 - diseases, uterine cervical
- MeSH C12.050.351.500.852.593.074 - dysplasia, uterine cervical
- MeSH C12.050.351.500.852.593.074.249 - atypical squamous cells of the cervix
- MeSH C12.050.351.500.852.593.074.500 - squamous intraepithelial lesions of the cervix
- MeSH C12.050.351.500.852.593.112 - erosion, uterine cervical
- MeSH C12.050.351.500.852.593.120 - incontinence, uterine cervical
- MeSH C12.050.351.500.852.593.131 - neoplasms, uterine cervical
- MeSH C12.050.351.500.852.593.150 - uterine cervicitis
- MeSH C12.050.351.500.852.762 - neoplasms, uterine
- MeSH C12.050.351.500.852.762.200 - endometrial neoplasms
- MeSH C12.050.351.500.852.762.200.500 - tumors, endometrial stromal
- MeSH C12.050.351.500.852.762.200.500.500 - sarcoma, endometrial stromal
- MeSH C12.050.351.500.852.762.850 - neoplasms, uterine cervical
- MeSH C12.050.351.500.894 - diseases, vaginal
- MeSH C12.050.351.500.894.834 - neoplasms, vaginal
- MeSH C12.050.351.500.894.870 - vaginismus
- MeSH C12.050.351.500.919 - vaginismus
- MeSH C12.050.351.500.944 - diseases, vulvar
- MeSH C12.050.351.500.944.819 - neoplasms, vulvar
- MeSH C12.050.351.625 - pelvic floor disorders
- MeSH C12.050.351.750 – tuberculosis, urogenital
- MeSH C12.050.351.750.940 – tuberculosis, female genital
- MeSH C12.050.351.750.970 – tuberculosis, renal
- MeSH C12.050.351.875 - urogenital abnormalities
- MeSH C12.050.351.875.132 – bladder exstrophy
- MeSH C12.050.351.875.132.500 – cloacal exstrophy
- MeSH C12.050.351.875.253 - disorders of sex development
- MeSH C12.050.351.875.466 – hypospadias
- MeSH C12.050.351.937 – urogenital neoplasms
- MeSH C12.050.351.937.418 – genital neoplasms, female
- MeSH C12.050.351.937.418.365 – fallopian tube neoplasms
- MeSH C12.050.351.937.418.685 - neoplasms, ovarian
- MeSH C12.050.351.937.418.685.265 - brenner tumor
- MeSH C12.050.351.937.418.685.331 - carcinoma, endometrioid
- MeSH C12.050.351.937.418.685.350 - carcinoma, ovarian epithelial
- MeSH C12.050.351.937.418.685.398 - tumor, granulosa cell
- MeSH C12.050.351.937.418.685.431 - syndrome, hereditary breast and ovarian cancer
- MeSH C12.050.351.937.418.685.464 - luteoma
- MeSH C12.050.351.937.418.685.531 - syndrome, meigsC12.050.351.937.418.685.531
- MeSH C12.050.351.937.418.685.648 – tumor, sertoli-leydig cell
- MeSH C12.050.351.937.418.685.765 - thecoma
- MeSH C12.050.351.937.418.875 - neoplasms, uterine
- MeSH C12.050.351.937.418.875.200 - endometrial neoplasms
- MeSH C12.050.351.937.418.875.200.124 - carcinoma, endometrioid
- MeSH C12.050.351.937.418.875.200.374 - tumors, endometrial stromal
- MeSH C12.050.351.937.418.875.200.374.500 - sarcoma, endometrial stromal
- MeSH C12.050.351.937.418.875.850 - neoplasms, uterine cervical
- MeSH C12.050.351.937.418.937 - neoplasms, vaginal
- MeSH C12.050.351.937.418.968 - neoplasms, vulvar
- MeSH C12.050.351.937.820 - urologic neoplasms
- MeSH C12.050.351.937.820.875 – urethral neoplasms
- MeSH C12.050.351.968 – urologic diseases
- MeSH C12.050.351.968.419 – kidney diseases
- MeSH C12.050.351.968.419.078 – anuria
- MeSH C12.050.351.968.419.912 – tuberculosis, renal
- MeSH C12.050.351.968.725.676 – urethral neoplasms
- MeSH C12.050.351.968.829.132 – bladder exstrophy
- MeSH C12.050.351.968.829.132.500 – cloacal exstrophy
- MeSH C12.050.351.968.934 – urination disorders
- MeSH C12.050.351.968.934.070 – anuria

==== MeSH C12.050.703 - pregnancy complications ====
- MeSH C12.050.703.039 - abortion, spontaneous
- MeSH C12.050.703.039.089.339 - incontinence, uterine cervical
- MeSH C12.050.703.565 - pelvic floor disorders

=== MeSH C12.100 – genital diseases ===
==== MeSH C12.100.250 – genital diseases, female ====
- MeSH C12.100.250.056 - adnexal diseases
- MeSH C12.100.250.056.390 – fallopian tube diseases
- MeSH C12.100.250.056.390.390 – fallopian tube neoplasms
- MeSH C12.100.250.056.390.890 - salpingitis
- MeSH C12.100.250.056.630 - diseases, ovarian
- MeSH C12.100.250.056.630.050 - anovulation
- MeSH C12.100.250.056.630.250 - menopause, premature
- MeSH C12.100.250.056.630.450 - oophoritis
- MeSH C12.100.250.056.630.580 - cysts, ovarian
- MeSH C12.100.250.056.630.580.765 - polyendocrine metabolic ovarian syndrome
- MeSH C12.100.250.056.630.705 - neoplasms, ovarian
- MeSH C12.100.250.056.630.705.265 - brenner tumor
- MeSH C12.100.250.056.630.705.331 - carcinoma, endometrioid
- MeSH C12.100.250.056.630.705.350 - carcinoma, ovarian epithelial
- MeSH C12.100.250.056.630.705.398 - tumor, granulosa cell
- MeSH C12.100.250.056.630.705.431 - syndrome, hereditary breast and ovarian cancer
- MeSH C12.100.250.056.630.705.464 - luteoma
- MeSH C12.100.250.056.630.705.531 - syndrome, meigsC12.050.351.937.418.685.531
- MeSH C12.100.250.056.630.705.648 – tumor, sertoli-leydig cell
- MeSH C12.100.250.056.630.705.765 - thecoma
- MeSH C12.100.250.056.630.728 - ovarian, torsion
- MeSH C12.100.250.056.630.750 - primary ovarian insufficiency
- MeSH C12.100.250.056.750 - inflammatory disease, pelvic
- MeSH C12.100.250.056.750.249 - endometritis
- MeSH C12.100.250.056.750.500 - oophoritis
- MeSH C12.050.351.500.056.750.249 - parametritis
- MeSH C12.100.250.056.750.875 - salpingitis
- MeSH C12.100.250.110 - dyspareunia
- MeSH C12.100.250.163 - endometriosis
- MeSH C12.100.250.242 – genital neoplasms, female
- MeSH C12.100.250.320 - gynatresia
- MeSH C12.100.250.342 – genitals, herpes
- MeSH C12.100.250.498 – infertility, female
- MeSH C12.100.250.630 - infections, reproductive tract
- MeSH C12.100.250.758 – tuberculosis, female genital
- MeSH C12.100.250.852 - uterine diseases
- MeSH C12.100.250.852.113 - adenomyosis
- MeSH C12.100.250.852.228 - endometrial hyperplasia
- MeSH C12.100.250.852.299 - endometritis
- MeSH C12.100.250.852.495 - hematometra
- MeSH C12.100.250.852.544 - pyometra
- MeSH C12.100.250.852.593 - diseases, uterine cervical
- MeSH C12.100.250.852.593.074 - dysplasia, uterine cervical
- MeSH C12.100.250.852.593.074.249 - atypical squamous cells of the cervix
- MeSH C12.100.250.852.593.074.500 - squamous intraepithelial lesions of the cervix
- MeSH C12.100.250.852.593.112 - erosion, uterine cervical
- MeSH C12.100.250.852.593.120 - incontinence, uterine cervical
- MeSH C12.100.250.852.593.131 - neoplasms, uterine cervical
- MeSH C12.100.250.852.593.150 - uterine cervicitis
- MeSH C12.100.250.852.544 - pyometra
- MeSH C12.100.250.852.762 - neoplasms, uterine
- MeSH C12.100.250.852.762.200 - endometrial neoplasms
- MeSH C12.100.250.852.762.200.500 - tumors, endometrial stromal
- MeSH C12.100.250.852.762.200.500.500 - sarcoma, endometrial+stromal
- MeSH C12.100.250.852.762.850 - neoplasms, uterine cervical
- MeSH C12.100.250.894 - diseases, vaginal
- MeSH C12.100.250.894.834 - neoplasms, vaginal
- MeSH C12.100.250.894.870 - vaginismus
- MeSH C12.100.250.919 - vaginismus
- MeSH C12.100.250.944 - diseases, vulvar
- MeSH C12.100.250.944.819 - neoplasms, vulvar

==== MeSH C12.100.500 – genital diseases, male ====
- MeSH C12.100.500.100 - dyspareunia
- MeSH C12.100.500.150 - ejaculatory dysfunction
- MeSH C12.100.500.150.500 - premature ejaculation
- MeSH C12.100.500.150.750 - retrograde ejaculation
- MeSH C12.100.500.199 – epididymitis
- MeSH C12.100.500.214 - erectile dysfunction
- MeSH C12.100.500.214.500 – impotence, vasculogenic
- MeSH C12.100.500.260 – genital neoplasms, male
- MeSH C12.100.500.260.500 – neoplasms, penile
- MeSH C12.100.500.260.750 – prostatic neoplasms, castration resistant
- MeSH C12.100.500.260.750.500 – prostatic neoplasms, castration resistant
- MeSH C12.100.500.260.937 – testicular neoplasms
- MeSH C12.100.500.260.937.500 – tumor, sertoli-leydig cell
- MeSH C12.100.500.329 – genitals, herpes
- MeSH C12.100.500.260.937.500.249 – tumor, leydig cell
- MeSH C12.100.500.260.937.500.500 – tumor, sertoli cell
- MeSH C12.100.500.430 – infertility, male
- MeSH C12.100.500.430.126 – aspermia
- MeSH C12.100.500.430.253 – asthenozoospermia
- MeSH C12.100.500.430.380 – azoospermia
- MeSH C12.100.500.430.508 – oligospermia
- MeSH C12.100.500.430.754 – sertoli cell-only syndrome
- MeSH C12.100.500.430.877 – teratozoospermia
- MeSH C12.100.500.494 – diseases, penile
- MeSH C12.100.500.494.400 – neoplasms, penile
- MeSH C12.100.500.494.591 – hypospadias
- MeSH C12.100.500.229 – fournier gangrene
- MeSH C12.100.500.565.625 – prostatic neoplasms
- MeSH C12.100.500.565.625.500 – prostatic neoplasms, castration resistant
- MeSH C12.100.500.604 - infections, reproductive tract
- MeSH C12.100.500.909 – tuberculosis, male genital

==== MeSH C12.100.750 – infertility ====
- MeSH C12.100.750.350 – infertility, female
- MeSH C12.100.750.700 – infertility, male
- MeSH C12.100.750.700.126 – aspermia
- MeSH C12.100.750.700.253 – asthenozoospermia
- MeSH C12.100.750.700.380 – azoospermia
- MeSH C12.100.750.700.508 – oligospermia
- MeSH C12.100.750.700.754 – sertoli cell-only syndrome
- MeSH C12.100.750.700.877 – teratozoospermia
- MeSH C12.100.875.242 - dyspareunia
- MeSH C12.100.875.364 - ejaculatory dysfunction
- MeSH C12.100.875.364.500 - premature ejaculation
- MeSH C12.100.875.364.750 - retrograde ejaculation
- MeSH C12.100.875.486 - erectile dysfunction
- MeSH C12.100.875.871 - vaginismus
- MeSH C12.100.937.640.350 – genitals, herpes

=== MeSH C12.200 – male urogenital diseases ===
- MeSH C12.200.483 - pelvic floor disorders
- MeSH C12.200.706 - urogenital abnormalities
- MeSH C12.200.706.132 – bladder exstrophy
- MeSH C12.200.706.132.500 – cloacal exstrophy
- MeSH C12.200.706.316 - disorders of sex development
- MeSH C12.200.706.516 – hypospadias

==== MeSH C12.200.777 – urologic diseases ====
- MeSH C12.200.777.419 – kidney diseases
- MeSH C12.200.777.419.078 – anuria
- MeSH C12.200.777.419.912 – tuberculosis, renal
- MeSH C12.200.777.725.676 – urethral neoplasms
- MeSH C12.200.777.829.132 – bladder exstrophy
- MeSH C12.200.777.829.132.500 – cloacal exstrophy
- MeSH C12.200.777.934 – urination disorders
- MeSH C12.777.934.284 – enuresis
- MeSH C12.777.934.600 – oliguria
- MeSH C12.777.934.616 – polyuria
- MeSH C12.777.934.852 – urinary incontinence
- MeSH C12.777.934.852.727 – urinary incontinence, stress
- MeSH C12.200.777.934.141 – anuria
- MeSH C12.777.934.880 – urinary retention

==== MeSH C12.200.294 – genital diseases, male ====
- MeSH C12.200.294.100 - dyspareunia
- MeSH C12.200.294.150 - ejaculatory dysfunction
- MeSH C12.200.294.150.500 - premature ejaculation
- MeSH C12.200.294.150.750 - retrograde ejaculation
- MeSH C12.200.294.229 – fournier gangrene
- MeSH C12.200.294.430 – infertility, male
- MeSH C12.200.294.199 – epididymitis
- MeSH C12.200.294.214 - erectile dysfunction
- MeSH C12.200.294.214.500 – impotence, vasculogenic
- MeSH C12.200.294.260 – genital neoplasms, male
- MeSH C12.200.294.260.500 – neoplasms, penile
- MeSH C12.200.294.260.750 – prostatic neoplasms
- MeSH C12.200.294.260.750.500 – prostatic neoplasms, castration resistant
- MeSH C12.200.294.260.937 – testicular neoplasms
- MeSH C12.200.294.260.937.500 – tumor, sertoli-leydig cell
- MeSH C12.200.294.260.937.500.249 – tumor, leydig cell
- MeSH C12.200.294.260.937.500.500 – tumor, sertoli cell
- MeSH C12.200.294.329 – genitals, herpes
- MeSH C12.200.294.494 – diseases, penile
- MeSH C12.200.294.494.400 – hypospadias
- MeSH C12.200.294.494.591 – neoplasms, penile
- MeSH C12.200.294.565.625 – prostatic neoplasms
- MeSH C12.200.294.565.625.500 – prostatic neoplasms, castration resistant
- MeSH C12.200.294.604 - infections, reproductive tract
- MeSH C12.200.672 – tuberculosis, urogenital
- MeSH C12.200.672.721 – tuberculosis, male genital
- MeSH C12.200.672.847 – tuberculosis, renal
- MeSH C12.200.294.909 – tuberculosis, male genital

==== MeSH C12.200.758 – urogenital neoplasms ====
- MeSH C12.200.758.409 – genital neoplasms, male
- MeSH C12.200.758.409.500 – neoplasms, penile
- MeSH C12.200.758.409.750 – prostatic neoplasms
- MeSH C12.200.758.409.750.500 – prostatic neoplasms, castration resistant
- MeSH C12.200.758.409.937 – testicular neoplasms
- MeSH C12.200.758.409.937.500 – tumor, sertoli-leydig cell
- MeSH C12.200.758.409.937.500.249 – tumor, leydig cell
- MeSH C12.200.758.409.937.500.500 – tumor, sertoli cell
- MeSH C12.200.758.820 - urologic neoplasms
- MeSH C12.200.758.820.875 – urethral neoplasms

==== MeSH C12.294.365 – infertility ====
- MeSH C12.294.365.700 – infertility, male
- MeSH C12.294.365.700.508 – oligospermia

==== MeSH C12.294.494 – penile diseases ====
- MeSH C12.294.494.136 – balanitis
- MeSH C12.294.494.508 – induration, penile
- MeSH C12.294.494.684 – phimosis
- MeSH C12.294.494.684.587 – paraphimosis
- MeSH C12.294.494.786 – priapism

==== MeSH C12.294.565 – prostatic diseases ====
- MeSH C12.294.565.500 – prostatic hyperplasia
- MeSH C12.294.565.750 – prostatitis

==== MeSH C12.294.644 – sexual dysfunction, physiological ====
- MeSH C12.294.644.486 – impotence
- MeSH C12.100.875.486.500 – impotence, vasculogenic

==== MeSH C12.294.829 – testicular diseases ====
- MeSH C12.294.829.258 – cryptorchidism
- MeSH C12.294.829.493 – orchitis

=== MeSH C12.740 – urogenital diseases ===
==== MeSH C12.740.700 – urogenital abnormalities ====
- MeSH C12.740.700.258 – cryptorchidism
- MeSH C12.740.700.374 – epispadias
- MeSH C12.740.700.445 – frasier syndrome
- MeSH C12.740.700.629 – multicystic dysplastic kidney
- MeSH C12.740.700.742 – nephritis, hereditary
- MeSH C12.740.700.842 – sex differentiation disorders
- MeSH C12.740.700.842.309 – gonadal dysgenesis
- MeSH C12.740.700.842.309.195 – gonadal dysgenesis, 46,xx
- MeSH C12.740.700.842.309.293 – gonadal dysgenesis, 46,xy
- MeSH C12.740.700.842.309.391 – gonadal dysgenesis, mixed
- MeSH C12.740.700.842.309.695 – turner syndrome
- MeSH C12.740.700.842.316 – hermaphroditism
- MeSH C12.740.700.842.316.313 – hermaphroditism, true
- MeSH C12.740.700.842.316.627 – pseudohermaphroditism
- MeSH C12.740.700.842.316.627.109 – androgen-insensitivity syndrome
- MeSH C12.740.700.842.316.627.220 – denys-drash syndrome
- MeSH C12.740.700.842.425 – kallmann syndrome
- MeSH C12.740.700.842.454 – klinefelter syndrome
- MeSH C12.740.700.921 – wagr syndrome

==== MeSH C12.740.800 – urogenital neoplasms ====
- MeSH C12.740.800.820.125 – bladder neoplasms
- MeSH C12.740.800.820.750 – kidney neoplasms
- MeSH C12.740.800.820.750.160 – carcinoma, renal cell
- MeSH C12.740.800.820.750.585 – wilms tumor
- MeSH C12.740.800.820.750.585.220 – denys-drash syndrome
- MeSH C12.740.800.820.750.585.950 – wagr syndrome
- MeSH C12.740.800.820.750.790 – nephroma, mesoblastic

=== MeSH C12.777 – urologic diseases ===
==== MeSH C12.777.103 – bladder diseases ====
- MeSH C12.777.103.124 – bladder calculi
- MeSH C12.777.103.187 – bladder fistula
- MeSH C12.777.103.187.733 – fistula, vesicovaginal
- MeSH C12.777.103.249 – obstruction, bladder neck
- MeSH C12.777.103.312 – bladder neoplasms
- MeSH C12.777.103.374 – bladder, neurogenic
- MeSH C12.777.103.495 – cystitis
- MeSH C12.777.103.495.500 – cystitis, interstitial
- MeSH C12.777.103.920 – vesico-ureteral reflux

==== MeSH C12.777.419 – kidney diseases ====
- MeSH C12.777.419.050 – aids-associated nephropathy
- MeSH C12.777.419.078 – anuria
- MeSH C12.777.419.135 – diabetes insipidus
- MeSH C12.777.419.135.500 – diabetes insipidus, nephrogenic
- MeSH C12.777.419.135.750 – diabetes insipidus, neurogenic
- MeSH C12.777.419.135.875 – wolfram syndrome
- MeSH C12.777.419.192 – diabetic nephropathies
- MeSH C12.777.419.250 – fanconi syndrome
- MeSH C12.777.419.291 – hepatorenal syndrome
- MeSH C12.777.419.307 – hydronephrosis
- MeSH C12.777.419.320 – hyperoxaluria, primary
- MeSH C12.777.419.331 – hypertension, renal
- MeSH C12.777.419.331.490 – hypertension, renovascular
- MeSH C12.777.419.373 – kidney calculi
- MeSH C12.777.419.393 – kidney cortex necrosis
- MeSH C12.777.419.403 – kidney diseases, cystic
- MeSH C12.777.419.403.500 – medullary sponge kidney
- MeSH C12.777.419.403.750 – multicystic dysplastic kidney
- MeSH C12.777.419.403.875 – polycystic kidney diseases
- MeSH C12.777.419.403.875.500 – polycystic kidney, autosomal dominant
- MeSH C12.777.419.403.875.510 – polycystic kidney, autosomal recessive
- MeSH C12.777.419.473 – kidney neoplasms
- MeSH C12.777.419.473.160 – carcinoma, renal cell
- MeSH C12.777.419.473.585 – wilms tumor
- MeSH C12.777.419.473.585.220 – denys-drash syndrome
- MeSH C12.777.419.473.585.950 – wagr syndrome
- MeSH C12.777.419.473.790 – nephroma, mesoblastic
- MeSH C12.777.419.493 – kidney papillary necrosis
- MeSH C12.777.419.570 – nephritis
- MeSH C12.777.419.570.363 – glomerulonephritis
- MeSH C12.777.419.570.363.304 – anti-glomerular basement membrane disease
- MeSH C12.777.419.570.363.304.300 – goodpasture syndrome
- MeSH C12.777.419.570.363.608 – glomerulonephritis, iga
- MeSH C12.777.419.570.363.615 – glomerulonephritis, membranoproliferative
- MeSH C12.777.419.570.363.625 – glomerulonephritis, membranous
- MeSH C12.777.419.570.363.640 – glomerulosclerosis, focal
- MeSH C12.777.419.570.363.680 – lupus nephritis
- MeSH C12.777.419.570.620 – nephritis, hereditary
- MeSH C12.777.419.570.643 – nephritis, interstitial
- MeSH C12.777.419.570.643.150 – balkan nephropathy
- MeSH C12.777.419.570.643.790 – pyelonephritis
- MeSH C12.777.419.570.643.790.810 – pyelonephritis, xanthogranulomatous
- MeSH C12.777.419.590 – nephrocalcinosis
- MeSH C12.777.419.610 – nephrosclerosis
- MeSH C12.777.419.630 – nephrosis
- MeSH C12.777.419.630.477 – nephrosis, lipoid
- MeSH C12.777.419.630.643 – nephrotic syndrome
- MeSH C12.777.419.685 – perinephritis
- MeSH C12.777.419.744 – pyelitis
- MeSH C12.777.419.744.717 – pyelonephritis
- MeSH C12.777.419.744.717.810 – pyelonephritis, xanthogranulomatous
- MeSH C12.777.419.775 – obstruction, renal artery
- MeSH C12.777.419.780 – renal insufficiency
- MeSH C12.777.419.780.500 – kidney failure
- MeSH C12.777.419.780.500.205 – kidney failure, acute
- MeSH C12.777.419.780.500.205.500 – kidney tubular necrosis, acute
- MeSH C12.777.419.780.500.602 – kidney failure, chronic
- MeSH C12.777.419.780.625 – renal insufficiency, acute
- MeSH C12.777.419.780.625.500 – kidney failure, acute
- MeSH C12.777.419.780.625.500.400 – kidney tubular necrosis, acute
- MeSH C12.777.419.780.750 – renal insufficiency, chronic
- MeSH C12.777.419.780.750.500 – kidney failure, chronic
- MeSH C12.777.419.795 – renal osteodystrophy
- MeSH C12.777.419.815 – renal tubular transport, inborn errors
- MeSH C12.777.419.815.093 – acidosis, renal tubular
- MeSH C12.777.419.815.191 – aminoaciduria, renal
- MeSH C12.777.419.815.191.250 – cystinuria
- MeSH C12.777.419.815.191.457 – hartnup disease
- MeSH C12.777.419.815.279 – bartter syndrome
- MeSH C12.777.419.815.368 – cystinosis
- MeSH C12.777.419.815.368.210 – fanconi syndrome
- MeSH C12.777.419.815.532 – glycosuria, renal
- MeSH C12.777.419.815.647 – hypophosphatemia, familial
- MeSH C12.777.419.815.720 – oculocerebrorenal syndrome
- MeSH C12.777.419.815.770 – pseudohypoaldosteronism
- MeSH C12.777.419.912 – tuberculosis, renal
- MeSH C12.777.419.936 – uremia
- MeSH C12.777.419.936.463 – hemolytic-uremic syndrome
- MeSH C12.777.419.978 – zellweger syndrome

==== MeSH C12.777.584 – proteinuria ====
- MeSH C12.777.584.269 – albuminuria

==== MeSH C12.777.725 – ureteral diseases ====
- MeSH C12.777.725.576 – ureteral calculi
- MeSH C12.777.725.776 – obstruction, ureteral
- MeSH C12.777.725.876 – ureterocele

==== MeSH C12.777.767 – urethral diseases ====
- MeSH C12.777.767.374 – epispadias
- MeSH C12.777.767.700 – urethral obstruction
- MeSH C12.777.767.700.150 – obstruction, bladder neck
- MeSH C12.777.767.700.700 – urethral structure
- MeSH C12.777.767.851 – urethritis
- MeSH C12.777.767.851.644 – reiter disease

==== MeSH C12.777.809 – urinary calculi ====
- MeSH C12.777.809.186 – bladder calculi
- MeSH C12.777.809.503 – kidney calculi
- MeSH C12.777.809.851 – ureteral calculi

==== MeSH C12.777.850 – urinary fistula ====
- MeSH C12.777.850.312 – bladder fistula
- MeSH C12.777.850.312.733 – vesicovaginal fistula

==== MeSH C12.777.892 – infections, urinary tract ====
- MeSH C12.777.892.219 – bacteriuria
- MeSH C12.777.892.719 – pyuria
- MeSH C12.777.892.775 – schistosomiasis haematobia

=== MeSH C12.800 – urogenital abnormalities ===
- MeSH C12.800.132 – bladder exstrophy
- MeSH C12.800.132.500 – cloacal exstrophy
- MeSH C12.800.316 - disorders of sex development
- MeSH C12.800.516 – hypospadias

=== MeSH C12.900 – urogenital neoplasms ===
==== MeSH C12.900.418 - genital neoplasms, female ====
- MeSH C12.900.418.365 – fallopian tube neoplasms
- MeSH C12.900.418.685 - neoplasms, ovarian
- MeSH C12.900.418.685.265 - brenner tumor
- MeSH C12.900.418.685.331 - carcinoma, endometrioid
- MeSH C12.900.418.685.350 - carcinoma, ovarian epithelial
- MeSH C12.900.418.685.398 - tumor, granulosa cell
- MeSH C12.900.418.685.431 - syndrome, hereditary breast and ovarian cancer
- MeSH C12.900.418.685.464 - luteoma
- MeSH C12.900.418.685.531 - syndrome, meigs
- MeSH C12.900.418.685.648 – tumor, sertoli-leydig cell
- MeSH C12.900.418.685.765 - thecoma
- MeSH C12.900.418.875 - neoplasms, uterine
- MeSH C12.900.418.875.200 - endometrial neoplasms
- MeSH C12.900.418.875.200.124 - carcinoma, endometrioid
- MeSH C12.900.418.875.200.374 - tumors, endometrial stromal
- MeSH C12.900.418.875.200.374.500 - sarcoma, endometrial stromal
- MeSH C12.900.418.875.850 - neoplasms, uterine cervical
- MeSH C12.900.418.937 - neoplasms, vaginal
- MeSH C12.900.418.968 - neoplasms, vulvar

==== MeSH C12.900.619 – genital neoplasms, male ====
- MeSH C12.900.619.500 – neoplasms, penile
- MeSH C12.900.619.750 – prostatic neoplasms
- MeSH C12.900.619.750.500 – prostatic neoplasms, castration resistant
- MeSH C12.900.619.937 – testicular neoplasms
- MeSH C12.900.619.937.500 – tumor, sertoli-leydig cell
- MeSH C12.900.619.937.500.249 – tumor, leydig cell
- MeSH C12.900.619.937.500.500 – tumor, sertoli cell
- MeSH C12.900.820 - urologic neoplasms
- MeSH C12.900.820.875 – urethral neoplasms

=== MeSH C12.950 – urologic diseases ===
==== MeSH C12.950.419 – kidney diseases ====
- MeSH C12.950.419.078 – anuria
- MeSH C12.950.419.912 – tuberculosis, renal
- MeSH C12.950.725.676 – urethral neoplasms
- MeSH C12.950.829.132 – bladder exstrophy
- MeSH C12.950.829.132.500 – cloacal exstrophy
- MeSH C12.950.934 – urination disorders
- MeSH C12.950.934.070 – anuria
- MeSH C12.950.983 - urologic neoplasms
- MeSH C12.950.983.875 – urethral neoplasms

The list continues at List of MeSH codes (C13).
