= List of MeSH codes (C13) =

The following is a partial list of the "C" codes for Medical Subject Headings (MeSH), as defined by the United States National Library of Medicine (NLM).

This list continues the information at List of MeSH codes (C12). Codes following these are found at List of MeSH codes (C14). For other MeSH codes, see List of MeSH codes.

The source for this content is the set of 2006 MeSH Trees from the NLM.

== MeSH C13 – female genital diseases and pregnancy complications ==
=== MeSH C13.371 – genital diseases, female ===
==== MeSH C13.371.056 – adnexal diseases ====
- MeSH C13.371.056.390 – fallopian tube diseases
- MeSH C13.371.056.390.390 – fallopian tube neoplasms
- MeSH C13.371.056.390.890 – salpingitis
- MeSH C13.371.056.630 – ovarian diseases
- MeSH C13.371.056.630.050 – anovulation
- MeSH C13.371.056.630.250 – menopause, premature
- MeSH C13.371.056.630.450 – oophoritis
- MeSH C13.371.056.630.580 – ovarian cysts
- MeSH C13.371.056.630.580.765 – polyendocrine metabolic ovarian syndrome
- MeSH C13.371.056.630.611 – ovarian failure, premature
- MeSH C13.371.056.630.642 – ovarian hyperstimulation syndrome
- MeSH C13.371.056.630.705 – ovarian neoplasms
- MeSH C13.371.056.630.705.265 – brenner tumor
- MeSH C13.371.056.630.705.331 – carcinoma, endometrioid
- MeSH C13.371.056.630.705.398 – granulosa cell tumor
- MeSH C13.371.056.630.705.464 – luteoma
- MeSH C13.371.056.630.705.531 – meigs syndrome
- MeSH C13.371.056.630.705.648 – sertoli-leydig cell tumor
- MeSH C13.371.056.630.705.765 – thecoma
- MeSH C13.371.056.750 – pelvic inflammatory disease
- MeSH C13.371.056.750.249 – endometritis
- MeSH C13.371.056.750.500 – oophoritis
- MeSH C13.371.056.750.750 – parametritis
- MeSH C13.371.056.750.875 – salpingitis

==== MeSH C13.371.365 – infertility ====
- MeSH C13.371.365.700 – infertility, female

==== MeSH C13.371.665 – sexual dysfunction, physiological ====
- MeSH C13.371.665.313 – dyspareunia
- MeSH C13.371.665.656 – vaginismus

==== MeSH C13.371.820 – urogenital diseases ====
- MeSH C13.371.820.042 – kidney diseases, cystic
- MeSH C13.371.820.042.500 – medullary sponge kidney
- MeSH C13.371.820.042.750 – multicystic dysplastic kidney
- MeSH C13.371.820.042.875 – polycystic kidney diseases
- MeSH C13.371.820.042.875.500 – polycystic kidney, autosomal dominant
- MeSH C13.371.820.042.875.510 – polycystic kidney, autosomal recessive
- MeSH C13.371.820.349 – tuberculosis, urogenital
- MeSH C13.371.820.349.940 – tuberculosis, female genital
- MeSH C13.371.820.349.970 – tuberculosis, renal
- MeSH C13.371.820.700 – urogenital abnormalities
- MeSH C13.371.820.700.132 – bladder exstrophy
- MeSH C13.371.820.700.374 – epispadias
- MeSH C13.371.820.700.420 – frasier syndrome
- MeSH C13.371.820.700.466 – hypospadias
- MeSH C13.371.820.700.558 – multicystic dysplastic kidney
- MeSH C13.371.820.700.742 – nephritis, hereditary
- MeSH C13.371.820.700.842 – sex differentiation disorders
- MeSH C13.371.820.700.842.260 – freemartinism
- MeSH C13.371.820.700.842.309 – gonadal dysgenesis
- MeSH C13.371.820.700.842.309.193 – gonadal dysgenesis, 46,xx
- MeSH C13.371.820.700.842.309.388 – gonadal dysgenesis, 46,xy
- MeSH C13.371.820.700.842.309.391 – gonadal dysgenesis, mixed
- MeSH C13.371.820.700.842.309.872 – turner syndrome
- MeSH C13.371.820.700.842.316 – hermaphroditism
- MeSH C13.371.820.700.842.316.313 – hermaphroditism, true
- MeSH C13.371.820.700.842.316.627 – pseudohermaphroditism
- MeSH C13.371.820.700.842.316.627.109 – androgen-insensitivity syndrome
- MeSH C13.371.820.700.842.316.627.220 – denys-drash syndrome
- MeSH C13.371.820.700.842.425 – kallmann syndrome
- MeSH C13.371.820.700.921 – wagr syndrome
- MeSH C13.371.820.800 – urogenital neoplasms
- MeSH C13.371.820.800.418 – genital neoplasms, female
- MeSH C13.371.820.800.418.365 – fallopian tube neoplasms
- MeSH C13.371.820.800.418.685 – ovarian neoplasms
- MeSH C13.371.820.800.418.685.265 – brenner tumor
- MeSH C13.371.820.800.418.685.331 – carcinoma, endometrioid
- MeSH C13.371.820.800.418.685.398 – granulosa cell tumor
- MeSH C13.371.820.800.418.685.464 – luteoma
- MeSH C13.371.820.800.418.685.531 – meigs syndrome
- MeSH C13.371.820.800.418.685.648 – sertoli-leydig cell tumor
- MeSH C13.371.820.800.418.685.765 – thecoma
- MeSH C13.371.820.800.418.875 – uterine neoplasms
- MeSH C13.371.820.800.418.875.200 – endometrial neoplasms
- MeSH C13.371.820.800.418.875.200.124 – carcinoma, endometrioid
- MeSH C13.371.820.800.418.875.200.374 – endometrial stromal tumors
- MeSH C13.371.820.800.418.875.200.374.500 – sarcoma, endometrial stromal
- MeSH C13.371.820.800.418.875.850 – uterine cervical neoplasms
- MeSH C13.371.820.800.418.937 – vaginal neoplasms
- MeSH C13.371.820.800.418.968 – vulvar neoplasms
- MeSH C13.371.820.800.820 – urologic neoplasms
- MeSH C13.371.820.800.820.125 – bladder neoplasms
- MeSH C13.371.820.800.820.535 – kidney neoplasms
- MeSH C13.371.820.800.820.535.160 – carcinoma, renal cell
- MeSH C13.371.820.800.820.535.585 – wilms tumor
- MeSH C13.371.820.800.820.535.585.220 – denys-drash syndrome
- MeSH C13.371.820.800.820.535.585.950 – wagr syndrome
- MeSH C13.371.820.800.820.535.790 – nephroma, mesoblastic
- MeSH C13.371.820.800.820.875 – ureteral neoplasms
- MeSH C13.371.820.800.820.890 – urethral neoplasms

==== MeSH C13.371.852 – uterine diseases ====
- MeSH C13.371.852.150 – uterine cervical diseases
- MeSH C13.371.852.150.074 – uterine cervical dysplasia
- MeSH C13.371.852.150.112 – uterine cervical erosion
- MeSH C13.371.852.150.120 – uterine cervical incompetence
- MeSH C13.371.852.150.131 – uterine cervical neoplasms
- MeSH C13.371.852.150.150 – uterine cervicitis
- MeSH C13.371.852.228 – endometrial hyperplasia
- MeSH C13.371.852.299 – endometritis
- MeSH C13.371.852.495 – hematometra
- MeSH C13.371.852.691 – uterine hemorrhage
- MeSH C13.371.852.691.449 – menorrhagia
- MeSH C13.371.852.691.622 – metrorrhagia
- MeSH C13.371.852.726 – uterine inversion
- MeSH C13.371.852.762 – uterine neoplasms
- MeSH C13.371.852.762.200 – endometrial neoplasms
- MeSH C13.371.852.762.200.500 – endometrial stromal tumors
- MeSH C13.371.852.762.200.500.500 – sarcoma, endometrial stromal
- MeSH C13.371.852.762.850 – uterine cervical neoplasms
- MeSH C13.371.852.833 – uterine prolapse
- MeSH C13.371.852.904 – uterine rupture
- MeSH C13.371.852.904.500 – uterine perforation

==== MeSH C13.371.894 – vaginal diseases ====
- MeSH C13.371.894.217 – dyspareunia
- MeSH C13.371.894.300 – hematocolpos
- MeSH C13.371.894.500 – hydrocolpos
- MeSH C13.371.894.700 – vaginal discharge
- MeSH C13.371.894.700.500 – leukorrhea
- MeSH C13.371.894.767 – vaginal fistula
- MeSH C13.371.894.834 – vaginal neoplasms
- MeSH C13.371.894.870 – vaginismus
- MeSH C13.371.894.906 – vaginitis
- MeSH C13.371.894.906.633 – trichomonas vaginitis
- MeSH C13.371.894.906.800 – vaginosis, bacterial
- MeSH C13.371.894.906.820 – vulvovaginitis
- MeSH C13.371.894.906.820.500 – candidiasis, vulvovaginal

==== MeSH C13.371.944 – vulvar diseases ====
- MeSH C13.371.944.626 – pruritus vulvae
- MeSH C13.371.944.815 – vulvar lichen sclerosus
- MeSH C13.371.944.819 – vulvar neoplasms
- MeSH C13.371.944.902 – vulvitis
- MeSH C13.371.944.902.737 – vulvovaginitis
- MeSH C13.371.944.902.737.500 – candidiasis, vulvovaginal

=== MeSH C13.703 – pregnancy complications ===
==== MeSH C13.703.039 – abortion, spontaneous ====
- MeSH C13.703.039.089 – abortion, habitual
- MeSH C13.703.039.089.339 – uterine cervical incompetence
- MeSH C13.703.039.093 – abortion, incomplete
- MeSH C13.703.039.173 – abortion, missed
- MeSH C13.703.039.256 – abortion, septic
- MeSH C13.703.039.339 – abortion, threatened
- MeSH C13.703.039.422 – abortion, veterinary
- MeSH C13.703.039.711 – embryo loss

==== MeSH C13.703.170 – diabetes, gestational ====
- MeSH C13.703.170.500 – fetal macrosomia

==== MeSH C13.703.243 – fetal death ====
- MeSH C13.703.243.300 – fetal resorption

==== MeSH C13.703.277 – fetal diseases ====
- MeSH C13.703.277.030 – chorioamnionitis
- MeSH C13.703.277.060 – erythroblastosis, fetal
- MeSH C13.703.277.060.480 – hydrops fetalis
- MeSH C13.703.277.080 – fetal alcohol syndrome
- MeSH C13.703.277.370 – fetal growth retardation
- MeSH C13.703.277.390 – fetal hypoxia
- MeSH C13.703.277.570 – fetal macrosomia
- MeSH C13.703.277.677 – fetal nutrition disorders
- MeSH C13.703.277.785 – meconium aspiration syndrome

==== MeSH C13.703.395 – hypertension, pregnancy-induced ====
- MeSH C13.703.395.124 – eclampsia
- MeSH C13.703.395.186 – hellp syndrome
- MeSH C13.703.395.249 – pre-eclampsia

==== MeSH C13.703.420 – obstetric labor complications ====
- MeSH C13.703.420.078 – abruptio placentae
- MeSH C13.703.420.183 – breech presentation
- MeSH C13.703.420.235 – cephalopelvic disproportion
- MeSH C13.703.420.288 – dystocia
- MeSH C13.703.420.288.728 – uterine inertia
- MeSH C13.703.420.339 – fetal membranes, premature rupture
- MeSH C13.703.420.339.260 – chorioamnionitis
- MeSH C13.703.420.491 – obstetric labor, premature
- MeSH C13.703.420.491.500 – premature birth
- MeSH C13.703.420.643 – placenta accreta
- MeSH C13.703.420.714 – placenta previa
- MeSH C13.703.420.725 – postpartum hemorrhage
- MeSH C13.703.420.814 – uterine inversion
- MeSH C13.703.420.904 – uterine rupture

==== MeSH C13.703.490 – morning sickness ====
- MeSH C13.703.490.500 – hyperemesis gravidarum

==== MeSH C13.703.590 – placenta diseases ====
- MeSH C13.703.590.132 – abruptio placentae
- MeSH C13.703.590.268 – chorioamnionitis
- MeSH C13.703.590.609 – placenta accreta
- MeSH C13.703.590.734 – placenta previa
- MeSH C13.703.590.767 – placenta, retained
- MeSH C13.703.590.800 – placental insufficiency

==== MeSH C13.703.634 – pregnancy complications, cardiovascular ====
- MeSH C13.703.634.404 – embolism, amniotic fluid

==== MeSH C13.703.700 – pregnancy complications, infectious ====
- MeSH C13.703.700.173 – abortion, septic
- MeSH C13.703.700.680 – pregnancy complications, parasitic
- MeSH C13.703.700.715 – puerperal infection

==== MeSH C13.703.720 – pregnancy complications, neoplastic ====
- MeSH C13.703.720.949 – trophoblastic neoplasms
- MeSH C13.703.720.949.416 – gestational trophoblastic neoplasms
- MeSH C13.703.720.949.416.218 – choriocarcinoma
- MeSH C13.703.720.949.416.218.875 – trophoblastic tumor, placental site
- MeSH C13.703.720.949.416.875 – hydatidiform mole
- MeSH C13.703.720.949.416.875.500 – hydatidiform mole, invasive

==== MeSH C13.703.726 – pregnancy in diabetics ====
- MeSH C13.703.726.570 – fetal macrosomia

==== MeSH C13.703.733 – pregnancy, ectopic ====
- MeSH C13.703.733.536 – pregnancy, abdominal
- MeSH C13.703.733.703 – pregnancy, tubal

==== MeSH C13.703.824 – prenatal injuries ====
- MeSH C13.703.824.500 – prenatal exposure delayed effects

==== MeSH C13.703.844 – puerperal disorders ====
- MeSH C13.703.844.253 – depression, postpartum
- MeSH C13.703.844.506 – lactation disorders
- MeSH C13.703.844.506.389 – galactorrhea
- MeSH C13.703.844.506.389.500 – chiari-frommel syndrome
- MeSH C13.703.844.603 – mastitis
- MeSH C13.703.844.700 – postpartum hemorrhage
- MeSH C13.703.844.714 – postpartum thyroiditis
- MeSH C13.703.844.728 – pubic symphysis diastasis
- MeSH C13.703.844.757 – puerperal infection

The list continues at List of MeSH codes (C14).
