= Puberty menorrhagia =

Excessive menstruation between puberty and 19 years of age is called puberty menorrhagia. Excessive menstruation is defined as bleeding over 80 ml per menstrual period or lasting more than 7 days. The most common cause for puberty menorrhagia is dysfunctional uterine bleeding. The other reasons are idiopathic thrombocytopenic purpura, hypothyroidism, genital tuberculosis, polyendocrine metabolic ovarian syndrome (PMOS), leukemia and coagulation disorders. The most common physiological reason for puberty menorrhagia is the immaturity of hypothalamic-pituitary-ovarian axis, leading to inadequate positive feedback and sustained high estrogen levels. Most patients present with anemia due to excessive blood loss.

The patient is assessed with a thorough medical history, physical examination (to look for features of anemia), gynaecological examination (to rule out local causes) and laboratory investigations (to rule out coagulopathies and malignancy). It is mandatory to exclude pregnancy. The treatment is determined based on the cause of menorrhagia. In case of puberty menorrhagia due to immaturity of hypothalamic axis, hormonal therapy is beneficial. Treatment for blood loss should be done simultaneously with iron therapy in mild to moderate blood loss and blood transfusion in severe blood loss.
