= Perinephric abscess =

Perinephric abscess (perirenal abscess) is a collection of purulent material contained within the perinephric space located between the kidney and Gerota's fascia. Perinephric abscess may develop from underlying renal infection spreading into the perinephric space, or less commonly by distant spread of infection through the blood. It is a severe condition which requires treatment with intravenous antibiotics, abscess drainage, and sometimes surgery.

== Signs and Symptoms ==
Perinephric abscess usually has nonspecific symptoms of infection. Cases may have a combination of abdominal or flank pain, fever, and chills. Unlike typical urinary tract infections, perinephric abscess often lacks symptoms such as urinary frequency or dysuria. Costovertebral angle tenderness is a common physical exam finding.

== Causes ==
Most perinephric abscesses result from complications of urologic infections such as pyelonephritis. Spread of infection into the perirenal fat can result in the formation of a perinephric abscess.

=== Risk Factors ===
Several risk factors make the development of perinephric abscess more likely in the setting of an initial infection:

- Diabetes mellitus
- Obstruction of the urinary tract (e.g. kidney stone)
- Severe urinary tract infection such as pyelonephritis or pyonephrosis
- Urinary tract abnormalities (e.g. Polycystic kidney disease)
- Malignancy
- Neurogenic bladder
- Urinary reflux
- Renal trauma

=== Organisms ===
Many bacteria species can be involved in a perinephric infection. Organisms causing renal abscess are often also the cause of perinephric abscess, especially Gram-negative bacteria. Some common organisms include:

- Escherichia coli
- Staphylococcus aureus
- Klebsiella pneumoniae
- Pseudomonas sp.
- Enterococcus sp.
- Coagulase-negative Staphylococci
- Streptococcus sp.
- Actinomyces sp.

Infection with fungi such as Candida sp. may also occur.

== Pathophysiology ==
Perinephric abscess can result from local bacterial invasion or spread of infection through the blood. Local infectious spread can occur in many ways. One mechanism for infection is from rupture of a renal abscess into the perinephric space. Other mechanisms include urinary obstruction, incomplete emptying of the bladder, urinary-tract stones, or conditions causing altered kidney structure, such as Polycystic Kidney Disease. Surgery or injury to the kidney can increase the risk for infection and abscess formation. Infection can also spread from neighboring organs, such as the bowel or gallbladder. Bloodborne bacteria spreading from distant sites of infection occurs in only one-third of cases.

== Diagnosis ==
Imaging is the primary means of diagnosing perinephric abscess. Ultrasound, CT (Computed Tomography), or MRI (Magnetic-Resonance Imaging) may be used. CT of the abdomen and pelvis with contrast is generally preferred due to availability of this test and the ability to measure the extent of disease for treatment guidance.

Laboratory studies such as complete blood count, basic metabolic panel, inflammatory markers, and urinalysis can support the diagnosis. Classic laboratory markers for urinary tract infection, like leukocyte count or urinalysis, may be normal or only mildly elevated. Blood, urine, or abscess cultures may also be obtained.

In cases where a patient is treated with empiric antibiotics for a different urinary tract infection, such as pyelonephritis, a poor response to treatment might raise suspicion for perinephric abscess.

== Treatment ==
Treatment centers around adequate antimicrobial therapy with the addition of needle drainage for larger abscesses. Surgery may be necessary in severe cases of perinephric abscess.

Intravenous antibiotics should be started promptly following the diagnosis of perinephric abscess. Many antibiotic regimens have been proposed for treatment, but generally begin with broad-spectrum coverage of Gram-positive and Gram-negative bacteria. If abscess cultures have been obtained, antibiotic coverage can be narrowed to the specific infectious organism.

Small abscesses less than 3 cm may be managed with antibiotics alone. Larger abscesses require needle drainage with assistance of CT or ultrasound to guide needle placement. In cases of prolonged infection, poor treatment response, or failing kidney function, surgical debridement and/or removal of the nonfunctioning kidney may be required.

Management of causes of the initial infection should be considered once improvement of the abscess is noted. Treatment of these causes may also require surgery (e.g. removal of obstructing kidney stone).

== Complications ==
Perinephric abscess is a severe disease which requires medical treatment for resolution. Disease severity is determined by patient comorbidities along with size and spread of the abscess.

Rupture of Gerota's fascia can lead to perinephric abscess entering the pararenal space. Spread of perinephric abscess along the fascial planes of Gerota's fascia inferior to the kidney may lead to infections of the pelvis and lumbar musculature. Spread of infection superior to the kidney can result in subphrenic abscess. If invasion through the diaphragm occurs, empyema and lung abscess may result.

== Epidemiology ==
Before the widespread use of antibiotics the primary cause of perinephric abscess was bloodborne bacteria from distant sites of infection entering the perinephric space. In current medical practice, direct spread from a renal abscess (often caused by urinary tract infection) is the most common means for the development of perinephric abscess.

Perinephric abscess historically held a high morbidity because quick and accurate diagnosis was difficult. With the introduction of computed tomography (CT) imaging, diagnosis, treatment, and recovery have improved significantly.

== See also ==
- Pyonephrosis
- Perinephritis
- Pyelonephritis
