= Drash =

Drash may refer to:

- Midrash, in Judaism, a method of exegesis of a biblical text
- DRASH, or Deployable Rapid Assembly Shelter, a brand of portable shelter
- Allan L. Drash (1931–2009), a pediatric endocrinologist from the United States
- Ultima: Escape from Mt. Drash (1983), a computer game
- West Country English word for threshing (i.e. using a flail to separate husks from ears of grain)
