= List of MeSH codes (C11) =

The following is a partial list of the "C" codes for Medical Subject Headings (MeSH), as defined by the United States National Library of Medicine (NLM).

This list continues the information at List of MeSH codes (C10). Codes following these are found at List of MeSH codes (C12). For other MeSH codes, see List of MeSH codes.

The source for this content is the set of 2006 MeSH Trees from the NLM.

== MeSH C11 – eye diseases ==
=== MeSH C11.187 – conjunctival diseases ===
- MeSH C11.187.169 – conjunctival neoplasms
- MeSH C11.187.183 – conjunctivitis
- MeSH C11.187.183.200 – conjunctivitis, allergic
- MeSH C11.187.183.220 – conjunctivitis, bacterial
- MeSH C11.187.183.220.250 – conjunctivitis, inclusion
- MeSH C11.187.183.220.538 – ophthalmia neonatorum
- MeSH C11.187.183.220.889 – trachoma
- MeSH C11.187.183.240 – conjunctivitis, viral
- MeSH C11.187.183.240.216 – conjunctivitis, acute hemorrhagic
- MeSH C11.187.183.394 – keratoconjunctivitis
- MeSH C11.187.183.394.520 – keratoconjunctivitis, infectious
- MeSH C11.187.183.394.550 – keratoconjunctivitis sicca
- MeSH C11.187.183.749 – Reactive arthritis
- MeSH C11.187.781 – pterygium
- MeSH C11.187.810 – xerophthalmia

=== MeSH C11.204 – corneal diseases ===
- MeSH C11.204.236 – corneal dystrophies, hereditary
- MeSH C11.204.236.438 – Fuchs' endothelial dystrophy
- MeSH C11.204.267 – corneal edema
- MeSH C11.204.290 – corneal neovascularization
- MeSH C11.204.299 – corneal opacity
- MeSH C11.204.299.070 – arcus senilis
- MeSH C11.204.564 – keratitis
- MeSH C11.204.564.112 – acanthamoeba keratitis
- MeSH C11.204.564.225 – corneal ulcer
- MeSH C11.204.564.425 – keratitis, herpetic
- MeSH C11.204.564.425.450 – keratitis, dendritic
- MeSH C11.204.564.585 – keratoconjunctivitis
- MeSH C11.204.564.585.500 – keratoconjunctivitis, infectious
- MeSH C11.204.564.585.630 – keratoconjunctivitis sicca
- MeSH C11.204.627 – keratoconus
- MeSH C11.204.813 – trachoma

=== MeSH C11.250 – eye abnormalities ===
- MeSH C11.250.060 – aniridia
- MeSH C11.250.060.950 – WAGR syndrome
- MeSH C11.250.080 – anophthalmos
- MeSH C11.250.090 – blepharophimosis
- MeSH C11.250.110 – coloboma
- MeSH C11.250.300 – ectopia lentis
- MeSH C11.250.480 – hydrophthalmos
- MeSH C11.250.566 – microphthalmos
- MeSH C11.250.666 – retinal dysplasia

=== MeSH C11.270 – eye diseases, hereditary ===
- MeSH C11.270.040 – albinism
- MeSH C11.270.040.090 – albinism, ocular
- MeSH C11.270.040.545 – albinism, oculocutaneous
- MeSH C11.270.040.545.400 – Hermansky–Pudlak syndrome
- MeSH C11.270.060 – aniridia
- MeSH C11.270.060.950 – WAGR syndrome
- MeSH C11.270.142 – choroideremia
- MeSH C11.270.162 – corneal dystrophies, hereditary
- MeSH C11.270.162.438 – Fuchs' endothelial dystrophy
- MeSH C11.270.235 – duane retraction syndrome
- MeSH C11.270.468 – gyrate atrophy
- MeSH C11.270.564 – optic atrophies, hereditary
- MeSH C11.270.564.400 – optic atrophy, hereditary, leber
- MeSH C11.270.564.500 – optic atrophy, autosomal dominant
- MeSH C11.270.564.980 – Wolfram syndrome
- MeSH C11.270.660 – retinal dysplasia
- MeSH C11.270.684 – retinitis pigmentosa
- MeSH C11.270.684.500 – Usher syndromes
- MeSH C11.270.842 – Graves' ophthalmopathy

=== MeSH C11.290 – eye hemorrhage ===
- MeSH C11.290.195 – choroid hemorrhage
- MeSH C11.290.484 – hyphema
- MeSH C11.290.807 – retinal hemorrhage
- MeSH C11.290.960 – vitreous hemorrhage

=== MeSH C11.294 – eye infections ===
- MeSH C11.294.177 – corneal ulcer
- MeSH C11.294.354 – eye infections, bacterial
- MeSH C11.294.354.220 – conjunctivitis, bacterial
- MeSH C11.294.354.220.250 – conjunctivitis, inclusion
- MeSH C11.294.354.220.625 – ophthalmia neonatorum
- MeSH C11.294.354.220.800 – trachoma
- MeSH C11.294.354.400 – hordeolum
- MeSH C11.294.354.450 – keratoconjunctivitis, infectious
- MeSH C11.294.354.800 – tuberculosis, ocular
- MeSH C11.294.354.900 – uveitis, suppurative
- MeSH C11.294.354.900.350 – endophthalmitis
- MeSH C11.294.354.900.675 – panophthalmitis
- MeSH C11.294.450 – eye infections, fungal
- MeSH C11.294.450.900 – uveitis, suppurative
- MeSH C11.294.450.900.350 – endophthalmitis
- MeSH C11.294.450.900.675 – panophthalmitis
- MeSH C11.294.725 – eye infections, parasitic
- MeSH C11.294.725.125 – acanthamoeba keratitis
- MeSH C11.294.725.562 – onchocerciasis, ocular
- MeSH C11.294.725.781 – toxoplasmosis, ocular
- MeSH C11.294.800 – eye infections, viral
- MeSH C11.294.800.250 – conjunctivitis, viral
- MeSH C11.294.800.250.250 – conjunctivitis, acute hemorrhagic
- MeSH C11.294.800.270 – cytomegalovirus retinitis
- MeSH C11.294.800.450 – herpes zoster ophthalmicus
- MeSH C11.294.800.475 – keratitis, herpetic
- MeSH C11.294.800.475.450 – keratitis, dendritic

=== MeSH C11.319 – eye neoplasms ===
- MeSH C11.319.217 – conjunctival neoplasms
- MeSH C11.319.421 – eyelid neoplasms
- MeSH C11.319.457 – orbital neoplasms
- MeSH C11.319.475 – retinal neoplasms
- MeSH C11.319.475.760 – retinoblastoma
- MeSH C11.319.494 – uveal neoplasms
- MeSH C11.319.494.198 – choroid neoplasms
- MeSH C11.319.494.400 – iris neoplasms

=== MeSH C11.338 – eyelid diseases ===
- MeSH C11.338.133 – blepharitis
- MeSH C11.338.190 – blepharophimosis
- MeSH C11.338.204 – blepharoptosis
- MeSH C11.338.250 – blepharospasm
- MeSH C11.338.300 – chalazion
- MeSH C11.338.362 – ectropion
- MeSH C11.338.443 – entropion
- MeSH C11.338.526 – eyelid neoplasms
- MeSH C11.338.648 – hordeolum

=== MeSH C11.496 – Lacrimal apparatus diseases ===
- MeSH C11.496.221 – dacryocystitis
- MeSH C11.496.260 – dry eye syndromes
- MeSH C11.496.260.394 – keratoconjunctivitis sicca
- MeSH C11.496.260.719 – Sjögren syndrome
- MeSH C11.496.260.892 – xerophthalmia
- MeSH C11.496.456 – lacrimal duct obstruction

=== MeSH C11.510 – lens diseases ===
- MeSH C11.510.103 – aphakia
- MeSH C11.510.103.110 – aphakia, postcataract
- MeSH C11.510.245 – cataract
- MeSH C11.510.598 – lens subluxation
- MeSH C11.510.598.373 – ectopia lentis

=== MeSH C11.525 – ocular hypertension ===
- MeSH C11.525.381 – glaucoma
- MeSH C11.525.381.056 – glaucoma, angle-closure
- MeSH C11.525.381.348 – glaucoma, neovascular
- MeSH C11.525.381.407 – glaucoma, open-angle
- MeSH C11.525.381.407.480 – hydrophthalmos

=== MeSH C11.590 – ocular motility disorders ===
- MeSH C11.590.224 – Duane retraction syndrome
- MeSH C11.590.312 – Miller Fisher syndrome
- MeSH C11.590.400 – nystagmus, pathologic
- MeSH C11.590.400.300 – nystagmus, congenital
- MeSH C11.590.436 – oculomotor nerve diseases
- MeSH C11.590.436.200 – Adie syndrome
- MeSH C11.590.472 – ophthalmoplegia
- MeSH C11.590.472.250 – ophthalmoplegia, chronic progressive external
- MeSH C11.590.472.500 – supranuclear palsy, progressive
- MeSH C11.590.641 – ophthalmoplegia, chronic progressive external
- MeSH C11.590.641.500 – Kearns–Sayre syndrome
- MeSH C11.590.810 – strabismus
- MeSH C11.590.810.400 – esotropia
- MeSH C11.590.810.440 – exotropia
- MeSH C11.590.905 – Tolosa–Hunt syndrome

=== MeSH C11.640 – optic nerve diseases ===
- MeSH C11.640.451 – optic atrophy
- MeSH C11.640.451.451 – optic atrophies, hereditary
- MeSH C11.640.451.451.400 – optic atrophy, hereditary, leber
- MeSH C11.640.451.451.500 – optic atrophy, autosomal dominant
- MeSH C11.640.451.451.980 – wolfram syndrome
- MeSH C11.640.513 – optic disk drusen
- MeSH C11.640.530 – optic nerve injuries
- MeSH C11.640.544 – optic nerve neoplasms
- MeSH C11.640.544.500 – optic nerve glioma
- MeSH C11.640.576 – optic neuritis
- MeSH C11.640.576.695 – neuromyelitis optica
- MeSH C11.640.643 – optic neuropathy, ischemic
- MeSH C11.640.710 – papilledema

=== MeSH C11.675 – orbital diseases ===
- MeSH C11.675.319 – enophthalmos
- MeSH C11.675.349 – exophthalmos
- MeSH C11.675.349.500 – Graves' disease
- MeSH C11.675.349.500.500 – Graves ophthalmopathy
- MeSH C11.675.504 – granuloma, plasma cell, orbital
- MeSH C11.675.659 – orbital neoplasms
- MeSH C11.675.700 – retrobulbar hemorrhage

=== MeSH C11.710 – pupil disorders ===
- MeSH C11.710.090 – anisocoria
- MeSH C11.710.528 – miosis
- MeSH C11.710.528.500 – horner syndrome
- MeSH C11.710.570 – mydriasis
- MeSH C11.710.800 – tonic pupil
- MeSH C11.710.800.180 – aide syndrome

=== MeSH C11.744 – refractive errors ===
- MeSH C11.744.116 – aniseikonia
- MeSH C11.744.126 – anisometropia
- MeSH C11.744.212 – astigmatism
- MeSH C11.744.479 – hyperopia
- MeSH C11.744.636 – myopia
- MeSH C11.744.636.500 – myopia, degenerative
- MeSH C11.744.786 – presbyopia

=== MeSH C11.768 – retinal diseases ===
- MeSH C11.768.094 – angioid streaks
- MeSH C11.768.257 – diabetic retinopathy
- MeSH C11.768.328 – epiretinal membrane
- MeSH C11.768.400 – retinal artery occlusion
- MeSH C11.768.585 – retinal degeneration
- MeSH C11.768.585.439 – macular degeneration
- MeSH C11.768.585.439.245 – macular edema, cystoid
- MeSH C11.768.585.585 – retinal drusen
- MeSH C11.768.585.731 – retinitis pigmentosa
- MeSH C11.768.585.731.627 – kearns-sayer syndrome
- MeSH C11.768.585.731.813 – usher syndromes
- MeSH C11.768.585.865 – retinoschisis
- MeSH C11.768.648 – retinal detachment
- MeSH C11.768.660 – retinal dysplasia
- MeSH C11.768.710 – retinal hemorrhage
- MeSH C11.768.717 – retinal neoplasms
- MeSH C11.768.717.760 – retinoblastoma
- MeSH C11.768.725 – retinal neovascularization
- MeSH C11.768.740 – retinal perforations
- MeSH C11.768.757 – retinal vasculitis
- MeSH C11.768.760 – retinal vein occlusion
- MeSH C11.768.773 – retinitis
- MeSH C11.768.773.348 – chorioretinitis
- MeSH C11.768.773.360 – cytomegalovirus retinitis
- MeSH C11.768.773.674 – retinal necrosis syndrome, acute
- MeSH C11.768.836 – retinopathy of prematurity
- MeSH C11.768.890 – vitreoretinopathy, proliferative

=== MeSH C11.790 – scleral diseases ===
- MeSH C11.790.500 – scleritis

=== MeSH C11.941 – uveal diseases ===
- MeSH C11.941.160 – choroid diseases
- MeSH C11.941.160.177 – choroid hemorrhage
- MeSH C11.941.160.238 – choroid neoplasms
- MeSH C11.941.160.244 – choroidal neovascularization
- MeSH C11.941.160.300 – choroideremia
- MeSH C11.941.160.478 – choroiditis
- MeSH C11.941.160.478.400 – chorioretinitis
- MeSH C11.941.160.478.700 – pars planitis
- MeSH C11.941.160.578 – gyrate atrophy
- MeSH C11.941.375 – iris diseases
- MeSH C11.941.375.060 – aniridia
- MeSH C11.941.375.060.950 – WAGR syndrome
- MeSH C11.941.375.285 – exfoliation syndrome
- MeSH C11.941.375.360 – iridocyclitis
- MeSH C11.941.375.375 – iris neoplasms
- MeSH C11.941.375.385 – iritis
- MeSH C11.941.855 – uveal neoplasms
- MeSH C11.941.855.198 – choroid neoplasms
- MeSH C11.941.855.400 – iris neoplasms
- MeSH C11.941.879 – uveitis
- MeSH C11.941.879.780 – panuveitis
- MeSH C11.941.879.780.500 – ophthalmia, sympathetic
- MeSH C11.941.879.780.880 – uveitis, anterior
- MeSH C11.941.879.780.880.200 – behcet syndrome
- MeSH C11.941.879.780.880.400 – iridocyclitis
- MeSH C11.941.879.780.880.448 – iritis
- MeSH C11.941.879.780.900 – uveitis, posterior
- MeSH C11.941.879.780.900.300 – choroiditis
- MeSH C11.941.879.780.900.300.318 – chorioretinitis
- MeSH C11.941.879.780.900.300.659 – pars planitis
- MeSH C11.941.879.900 – uveitis, intermediate
- MeSH C11.941.879.900.500 – pars planitis
- MeSH C11.941.879.960 – uveitis, suppurative
- MeSH C11.941.879.960.380 – endophthalmitis
- MeSH C11.941.879.960.580 – panophthalmitis
- MeSH C11.941.879.980 – uveomeningoencephalitic syndrome

=== MeSH C11.966 – vision disorders ===
- MeSH C11.966.073 – amblyopia
- MeSH C11.966.075 – blindness
- MeSH C11.966.075.125 – amaurosis fugax
- MeSH C11.966.075.250 – blindness, cortical
- MeSH C11.966.075.500 – hemianopsia
- MeSH C11.966.256 – color vision defects
- MeSH C11.966.339 – diplopia
- MeSH C11.966.671 – night blindness
- MeSH C11.966.741 – photophobia
- MeSH C11.966.811 – scotoma
- MeSH C11.966.905 – vision, low

=== MeSH C11.980 – vitreous detachment ===
The list continues at List of MeSH codes (C12).
