= Tubal factor infertility =

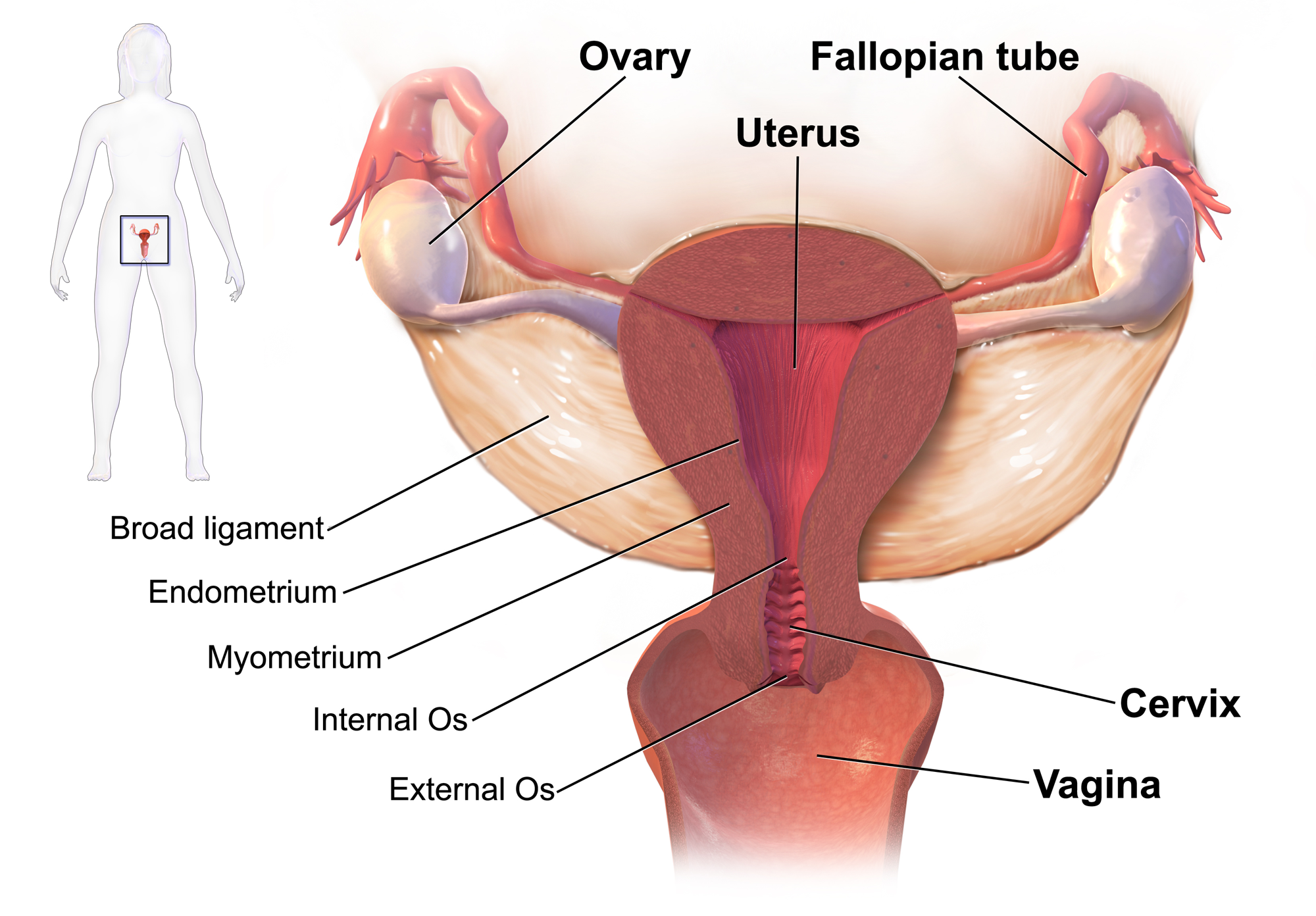
- The fallopian tubes are the site of tubal factor infertility
- Specialty: Obstetrics, gynecology

Tubal factor infertility (TFI) is female infertility caused by diseases, obstructions, damage, scarring, congenital malformations or other factors which impede the descent of a fertilized or unfertilized ovum into the uterus through the fallopian tubes and prevents a normal pregnancy and full term birth. Tubal factors cause 25-30% of infertility cases. Tubal factor is one complication of chlamydia trachomatis infection in women.

Sexually transmitted chlamydia and genital mycoplasma infections are preventable causes of infertility and negative pregnancy outcomes. When the infections progress and ascend, they can result in TFI. Infertility can have multiple possible causes and may not be recognized for years after a gonorrhea, chlamydia or Mycoplasma infection has caused tubal damage, as the affected woman may not have attempted to become pregnant until years later.

== Signs and symptoms ==
Infertility is the major symptom of TFI and is generally defined as a woman under 35 who has not become pregnant after 12 months without the use of contraception. Twelve months is the lower reference limit for Time to Pregnancy (TTP) by the World Health Organization. When the inability to conceive is accompanied by signs and symptoms of pelvic inflammatory disease such as lower abdominal pain, TFI may be present. A history of pelvic inflammatory disease, the laproscopic evidence of scarring and a diagnosis of salpingitis supports the diagnosis.

== Cause ==
Tubal factor infertility can be due to chlamydia infection and testing for chlamydia antibodies is one diagnostic tool. A Mycoplasma genitalium infection has also been linked to TFI. Women have difficulty getting pregnant or carrying a baby to term due to the buildup of scar tissue in the fallopian tubes causing damage to the cilia on the epithelial cells. TFI can also be due to endometriosis.

== Diagnosis ==
The physician will obtain a medical history and evaluate for tubal obstructions and infections. Obstruction can occur anywhere along the length of the tube. It can be partially or completely blocked. The extent of obstruction is typically assessed using hysterosalpingogram (HSG). Some use laparoscopy to establish the extent of the disease. Pelvic adhesions can be visualized, if present.

Distal tubal obstruction is more often observed (70%) than proximal obstruction. It can be caused by hydrosalpinges, pelvic adhesions, or fusion of the fimbriae. Tubal obstruction is caused by infection, endometriosis, myomas, salpingitis isthmica nodosa (SIN), or dried mucus. Because the tube can spasm during the injection of the dye during a hysterosalpingogram, it can be misdiagnosed.

== Treatment ==
If tubal factor infertility is suspected to be the cause of the infertility treatment begins with or without confirmation of infection because of complications that may result from delayed treatment. Appropriate treatment depends on the infectious agent and utilizes antibiotic therapy. Treating the sexual partner for possible STIs helps in treatment and prevents reinfection. Antibiotic administration affects the short or long-term major outcome of women with mild or moderate disease.

For women with infections of mild to moderate severity, parenteral and oral therapies are prescribed. Typical antibiotics used are cefoxitin or cefotetan plus doxycycline, and clindamycin plus gentamicin. An alternative parenteral regimen is ampicillin/sulbactam plus doxycycline. Once infection has been eliminated, surgery may be successful in opening the lumen of the fallopian tubes to allow a successful pregnancy and birth.

== See also ==
- Peritonitis
- Mycoplasma hominis
