= Uterine appendages =

A medical term for a body part

- Schematic frontal view of female anatomy

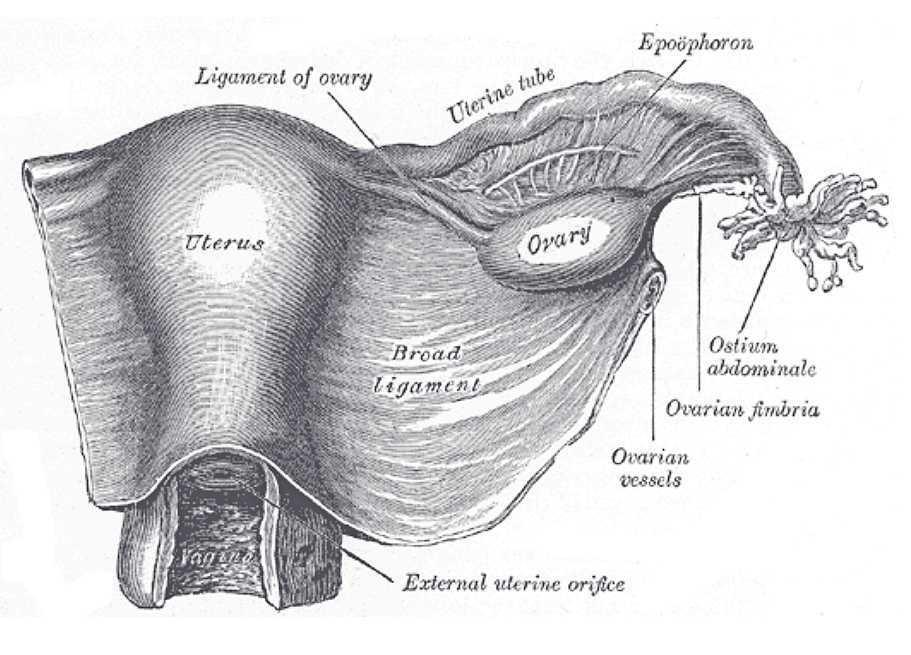
- Uterus and right broad ligament, seen from behind. (In this orientation, the contents "in front" of the broad ligament are posterior to it.)

Details

Identifiers
- Latin: adnexa uteri
- MeSH: D000290

The uterine appendages (or adnexa of uterus) are the structures most closely related structurally and functionally to the uterus.

== Terminology ==
They can be defined in slightly different ways:

- Some sources define the adnexa as the fallopian tubes and ovaries.
- Others include the supporting tissues".
- Another source defines the appendages as the "regions of the true pelvis posterior to the broad ligaments".
- One dictionary includes the fallopian tubes, ovaries, and ligaments (without specifying precisely which ligaments are included).

== Clinical significance ==
The term "adnexitis" is sometimes used to describe an inflammation of the uterine appendages (adnexa). In this context, it replaces the terms oophoritis and salpingitis.

The term adnexal mass is sometimes used when the location of a uterine mass is not yet more precisely known.

63% of ectopic pregnancies present with an adnexal mass. Depending on the size of the mass, it could be a medical emergency.

The term "adnexectomy" in gynaecology is often used for salpingo-oophorectomy (removal of both: fallopian tubes and ovaries).

== Additional images ==
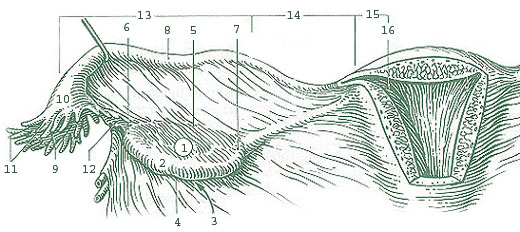
Ovary

== See also ==
- Adnexa (disambiguation)
