= Adnexa =

In anatomy, adnexa (plural) refers to the appendages of an organ. The term adnexa is from the Latin word adnexa (appendages).

More specifically, it can refer to:

- Adnexa of eye (accessory visual structures)
- Adnexa of skin (skin appendages)
- Adnexa of uterus (uterine appendages)
