= Ejaculatory dysfunction =

Ejaculatory dysfunction can refer to:

- Premature ejaculation, an orgasm and ejaculation that is perceived to occur too quickly
- Delayed ejaculation, difficulty to achieve an orgasm and ejaculation
- Anorgasmia, an inability to achieve an orgasm and, in men, ejaculation

== See also ==
- Erectile dysfunction
- Sexual dysfunction
