= Frasier syndrome =

- Specialty: Endocrinology, obstetrics and gynaecology, urology, medical genetics

Frasier syndrome is a urogenital anomaly associated with the WT1 (Wilms tumor 1 gene) gene.

It was first characterized in 1964.

== Presentation ==
Both males and females can have Frasier syndrome but their presentations can be different. Affected females usually have normal genitalia and gonads and have only the features of impaired renal function, which may not present until early childhood or even adolescence. Because females do not have all the features of the condition (e.g. gonadal dysgenesis), females are usually given the diagnosis of isolated nephrotic syndrome. Frasier syndrome in some infants may therefore go unrecognized until the affected child presents with signs of renal impairment and further testing is undertaken to evaluate the cause. In infants with XY genotype it causes an intersex condition as a result of gonadal dysgenesis. Although males with Frasier syndrome have the typical male chromosome pattern (46,XY), they have gonadal dysgenesis, in which external genitalia may not look clearly male or clearly female (ambiguous genitalia) or the genitalia appear completely female. The internal reproductive organs (gonads) are typically undeveloped and referred to as streak gonads. These abnormal gonads are nonfunctional and often become cancerous, so they are usually removed surgically early in life. Renal features of the condition include progressive glomerulonephropathy (focal segmental glomerulosclerosis). Patients are also at increased risk of genito-urinary tumors (usually gonadoblastoma).

The glomerulonephropathy presents later than in Denys–Drash syndrome, and the tumour risk phenotype is different; whilst Denys–Drash syndrome is associated with Wilms' tumour, Frasier syndrome is associated with gonadoblastoma. Differentiating between the two syndromes can be challenging.

== Genetics ==
The WT1 gene exists on chromosome 11 (at 11p13), and codes for a four zinc finger transcription factor. Its role as a transcription factor is related to proper kidney and gonadal development. The link between kidney and gonadal development and WT1 was highlighted in past studies looking at the related Denys–Drash syndrome. Results of various investigations identified the loss of function of WT1 to be a prerequisite of Wilms' tumour development, and also a key trait of individuals with genital abnormalities.

Mutations responsible for Frasier syndrome predominantly occur in intron 9 of the WT1 gene, specifically nucleotide substitutions that influence an intron splice site. Mutations in this region proved for the absence of three amino acids—K T S—between the third and fourth WT1 zinc fingers. Referring to the autosomal dominant expressive nature of this disease, it is only necessary for an individual to have one complement of the mutated intronic sequence to appear affected. Differing from the similar Denys-Drash syndrome, where a mutated form of the WT1 protein exists, Frasier syndrome expression works solely on the existence of a changed ratio of KTS isoforms: normal WT1 proteins including the KTS site (+KTS), and mutated, shortened proteins lacking the KTS site (−KTS). Through alternative splicing, a specific ratio of the two isoforms normally exists, though the mutation in the intron 9 splice site severely lowers levels of the +KTS isoform; this leads to Frasier syndrome.

=== Inheritance pattern ===
Frasier syndrome is inherited in an autosomal dominant fashion, indicating the need for only one mutated allele in a cell to lead to expression of the disease. Mutations predominantly occur de novo, allowing for expression in an individual that has no family history of it. The mutations occur during gamete formation or early in embryogenesis.

== Diagnosis ==
Genetic screening of children experiencing amenorrhea and steroid resistant nephrotic syndrome can diagnose Fraiser syndrome early, although the slow progression of renal failure makes diagnosis difficult.

== Treatment ==
Reconstructive surgery is an option for this condition
