= Allan L. Drash =

American Pediatric endocrinologist and diabetes association president (1931–2009)

- Born: August 13, 1931; Clarksville, TN
- Died: August 3, 2009 (aged 77); Pittsburgh, PA
- Education: Vanderbilt University, University of Virginia School of Medicine
- Occupation: pediatric endocrinologist
- Employer: University of Pittsburgh

Allan Drash was a pediatric endocrinologist and former president of the American Diabetes Association and was the second president of ISGD (now the International Society for Pediatric and Adolescent Diabetes for two terms from 1981-1984-1987. He was one of the original describers of the Denys-Drash syndrome.

== Publications ==
- Drash, Allan (1987). Clinical care of the diabetic child. Chicago: Year Book Medical Publishers. ISBN 978-0-8151-2904-2. OCLC 15017509.

== Honors and awards ==
- 2006 ISPAD Prize of Achievement

== Legacy ==
- Allan Drash Fellowship. Starting in 2006, International Society for Pediatric and Adolescent Diabetes has been awarding an annual 6 week clinical fellowship for applicants below 45 years in his name.
