= Pyometra =

- Other names: Pyometritis
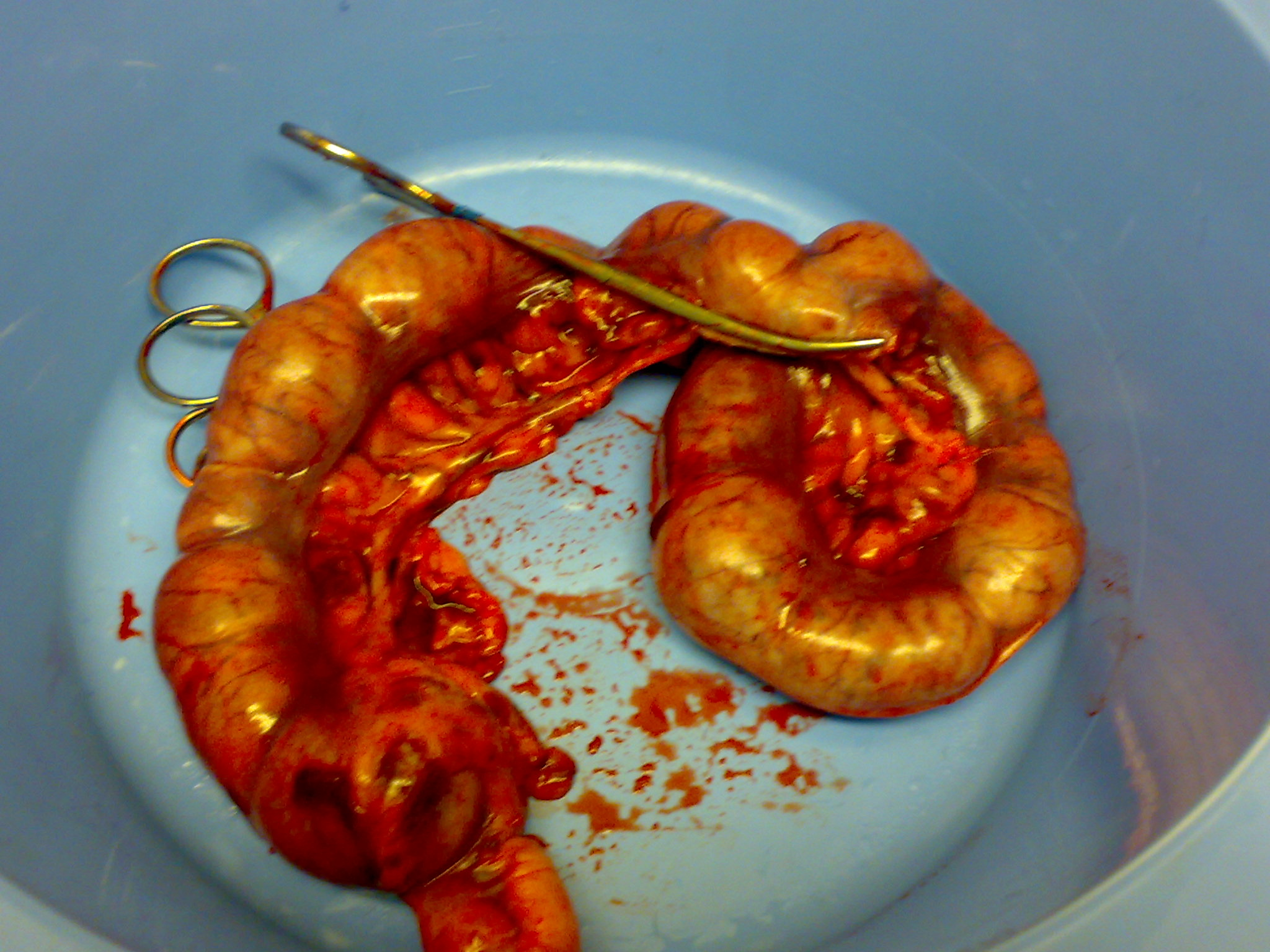
- A canine pyometric uterus immediately after surgery to remove it. It is extremely distended with purulent material.
- Specialty: Obstetrics, gynecology

Pyometra or pyometritis is a uterine infection. Though it is most commonly known as a disease of the entire female dog, it is also a notable human disease. It is also seen in female cattle, horses, goats, sheep, swine, cats, rabbits, hamsters, ferrets, chinchillas, rats and guinea pigs. Pyometra is an important disease to be aware of for any dog or cat owner because of the sudden nature of the disease and the deadly consequences if left untreated. It has been compared to acute appendicitis in humans, because both are essentially empyemas within an abdominal organ.

== Signs and symptoms ==
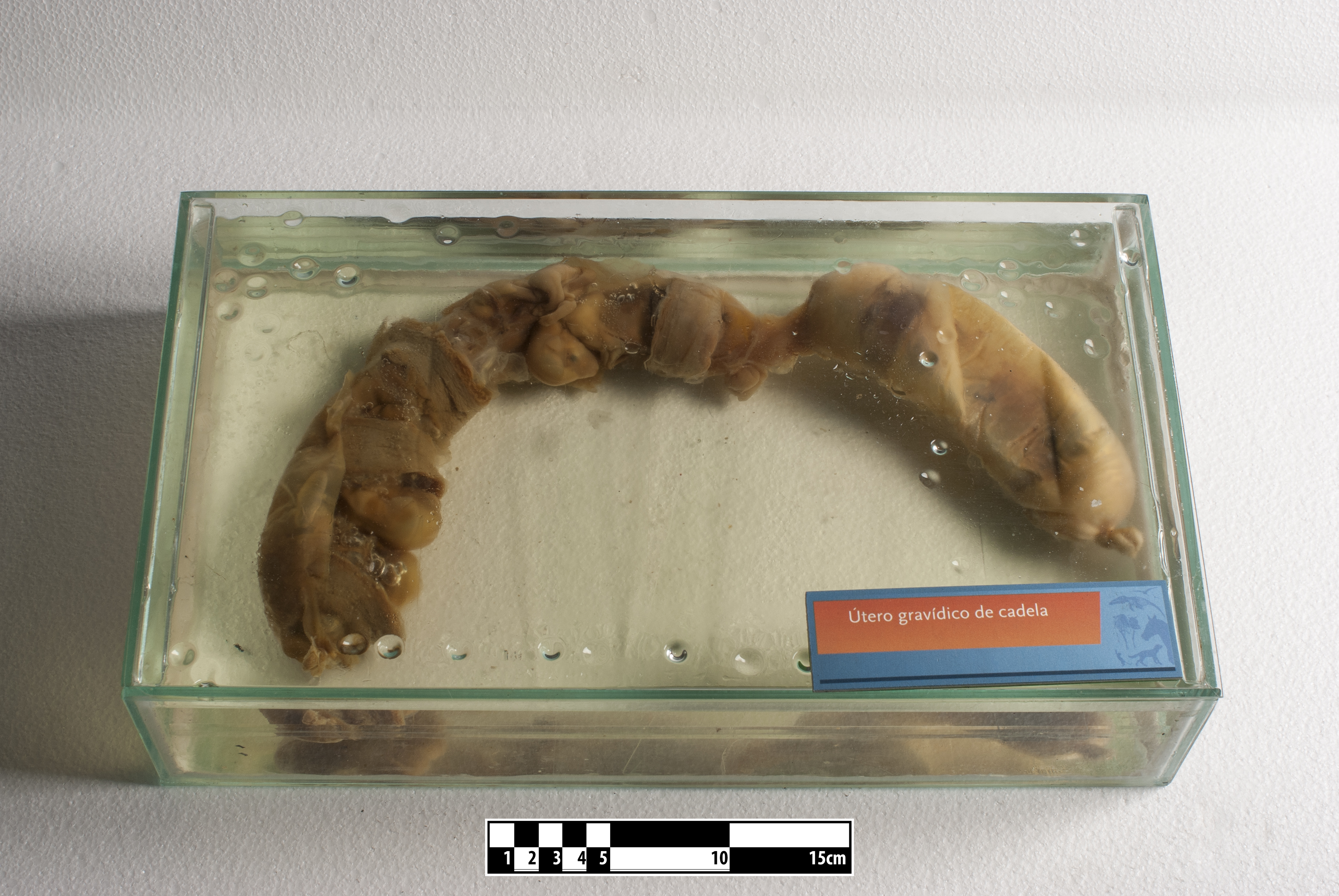
Uterus of a dog.

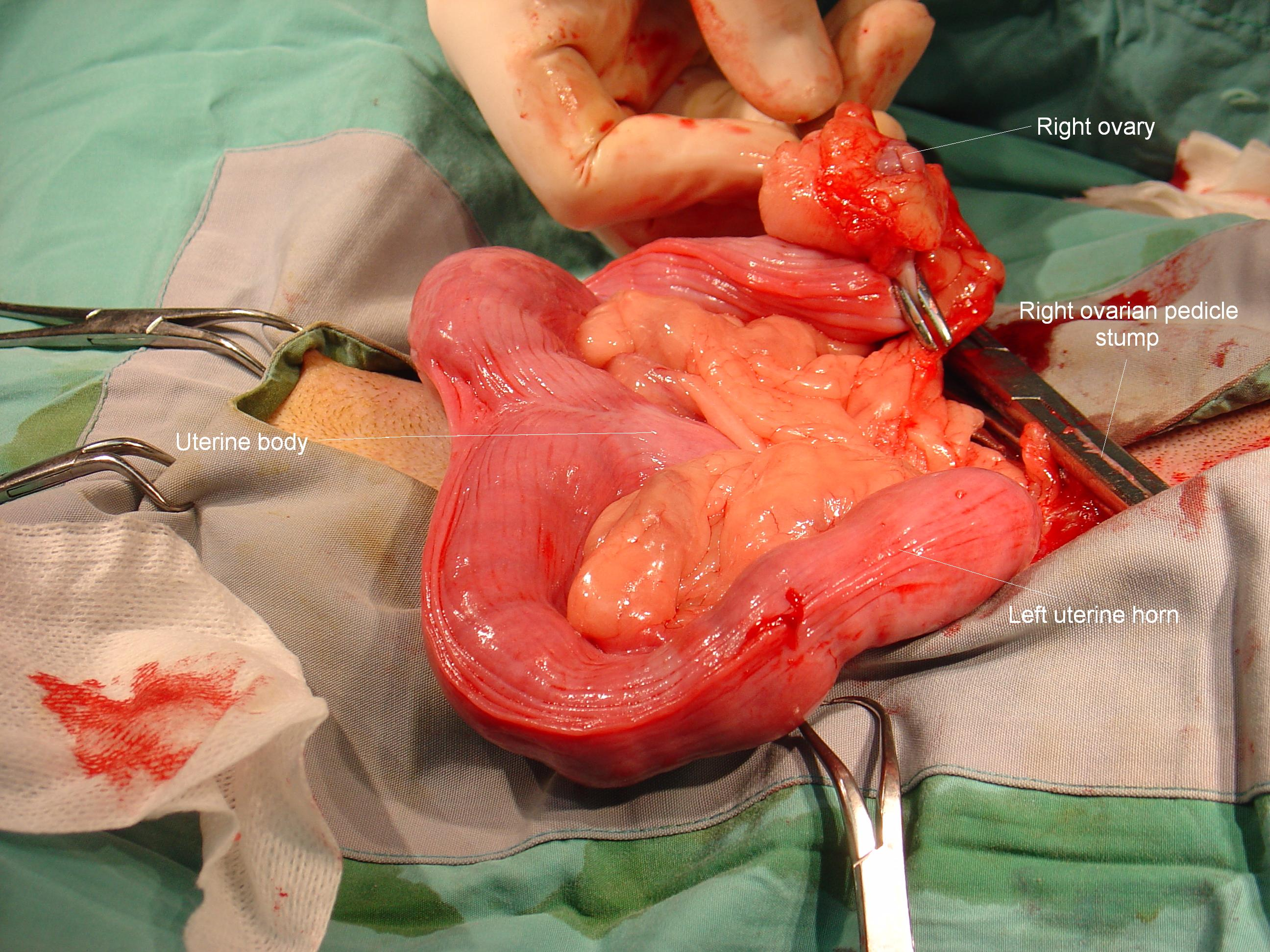
Pyometra in a dog

The most obvious symptom of open pyometra is a discharge of pus from the vulva in a female that has recently been in heat. However, symptoms of closed pyometra are less obvious. Symptoms of both types include vomiting, loss of appetite, depression, and increased drinking and urinating. Fever is seen in less than a third of female dogs with pyometra. Closed pyometra is a more serious condition than open pyometra not only because there is no outlet for the infection, but also because a diagnosis of closed pyometra can easily be missed due to its insidious nature. Bloodwork may show dehydration and/or increased white blood cell count. X-rays will show an enlarged uterus, and ultrasound will confirm the presence of a fluid filled uterus.

== Cause ==
The risk of developing pyometra differs between dog breeds. Pyometra is a result of hormonal and structural changes in the uterus lining. This can happen at any age, regardless of how many heat cycles have occurred or previous pregnancies (or lack thereof), although it becomes more common as the dog gets older. The main risk period for a female is for eight weeks after her peak standing heat has ended. Normally during this period, the cervix, which opens during heat, begins to close, and the inner lining begins to adapt back to normal. However, cystic hyperplasia of the endometrium (inner lining of the uterus) – known as cystic endometrial hyperplasia (CEH) – may occur at this time for some animals, as an inappropriate response to progesterone.

Under these circumstances, bacteria (especially E. coli) that have migrated from the vagina into the uterus find the environment favorable to growth, especially since progesterone also causes mucus secretion, closes the cervix (preventing uterine drainage), and decreases uterine contractility. The condition of the cervix is a major factor in the severity of the condition.

- If the cervix is open, the infected material can leave the body, and this is far easier and safer to treat. This is known as open pyometra.
- If the cervix is fully closed, there is no discharge from the vulva, and like in appendicitis, the uterus may rupture and pus escapes into the abdomen, causing peritonitis and possible rapid death. This is known as closed pyometra.

=== Hormonal influences and mis-mating shots ===
Females that have received estradiol as a mismating shot in diestrus are at risk for more severe disease because estrogen increases the number of progesterone receptors in the endometrium. 25 percent of females receiving estradiol in diestrus develop pyometra. Pyometra is less common in female cats because progesterone is only released by the ovaries after mating. Also in cats, the risk of developing the disease differs depending on breed.

== Treatment ==
The most important aspect of treatment of pyometra is quick action to provide supportive care. Female dogs are often septic and in shock (see septic shock). Intravenous fluids and antibiotics should be given immediately. Once the female dog has been stabilized, then the treatment of choice is an emergency ovariohysterectomy (surgical removal of the infected uterus and ovaries). In livestock the treatment of choice for minor cases is dinoprost tremethamine (lutalyse). Supportive antibiotic treatment may be recommended also. Severe cases require surgery.

In some rare instances, a stump pyometra can occur when an infection develops in the uterine tissue left behind after a spay procedure.
