= Denys–Drash syndrome =

- Other names: Drash syndrome
- Specialty: Oncology, endocrinology, urology, obstetrics and gynaecology, medical genetics

Denys–Drash syndrome (DDS) or Drash syndrome is a rare disorder or syndrome characterized by gonadal dysgenesis, nephropathy, and Wilms' tumor.

== Signs and symptoms ==
Clinically, Denys–Drash is characterized by the triad of pseudohermaphroditism, mesangial renal sclerosis, and Wilms' tumor. The condition first manifests as early nephrotic syndrome and progresses to mesangial renal sclerosis, and ultimately kidney failure—usually within the first three years of life.

Males with Denys–Drash syndrome exhibit gonadal dysgenesis and undescended testes. Females with Denys–Drash syndrome typically have normal genitalia.

The presenting characteristics of DDS include loss of playfulness, decreased appetite, weight loss, growth delay, abnormal skeletal development, insomnia, abdominal pain, constipation, and anuria.

== Causes ==
The cause of DDS is most commonly (96% of patients) an abnormality in the WT1 gene (Wilms tumor suppressor gene). These abnormalities include changes in certain exons (9 and 8) and mutations in some alleles of the WT1 gene. Genetically, the syndrome is due to mutations in the Wilms tumor suppressor gene, WT1, which is on chromosome 11 (11p13). These mutations are usually found in exons 8 or 9, but at least one has been reported in exon 4.

The condition can be inherited in an autosomal dominant pattern, but most cases occur due to new genetic mutations in people with no family history of the disorder.

== Prognosis ==
A 1994 review of 150 cases reported in the literature found that 38% had died with a mean age of death of 2 years. 32% were still alive at the time of the report with a mean age of 4.65. No data were available for the remainder. The author described living with DDS as "walking a multidimensional tight rope".

== History ==
P. Denys and Allan L. Drash first described the syndrome.

== See also ==
- Beckwith–Wiedemann syndrome
- WAGR syndrome
- Wilms' tumor
