= Luteoma =

Benign ovarian tumor

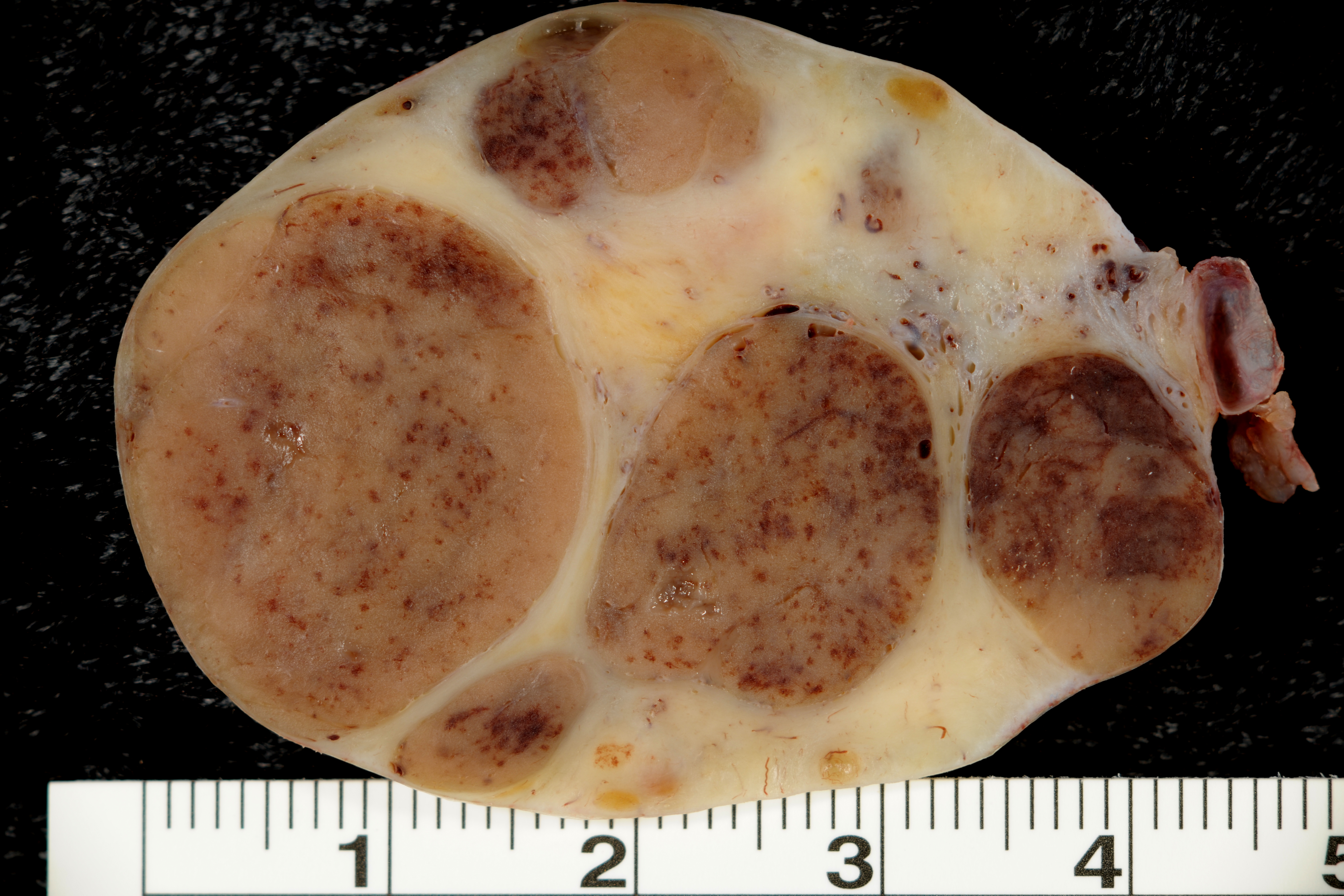
- Specialty: Obstetrics

A luteoma is a tumor that occurs in the ovaries during pregnancy. It is associated with an increase of sex hormones, primarily progesterone and testosterone. The size of the tumor can range from 1 to 25 cm in diameter, but is usually 6 to 10 cm in diameter and can grow throughout the duration of the pregnancy. However, luteomas are benign and resolve themselves after delivery. This type of tumor is rare with only about 200 documented cases; many of these cases were detected accidentally, so the actual rate of occurrence may be higher. The most obvious symptom of a luteoma is masculinization of the mother and the possible masculinization of the fetus. This occurs because of the release of testosterone by the luteoma. Testosterone is a sex hormone most abundant in men although small amounts are naturally present in women. Testosterone is responsible for the male characteristics such as deepening of the voice, growth of dark hair, and acne. While not life-threatening, the development of male characteristics associated with luteomas can cause visible changes in the mother and can have drastic effects on the formation of the fetus. Luteomas can cause the fetus to be born with an ambiguous sex, which, depending on how the parents prefer to raise the infant, may result in the parents choosing a sex for the fetus.

Luteomas can be associated with disorders of sex development (formerly known as pseudohermaphroditism).

== Signs and symptoms ==
Luteoma is frequently asymptomatic; only 36% of women actually show signs of masculinization. These signs include acne, the growth of dark hair (especially on the face), deepening of the voice, temporal balding, and clitoromegaly. An increase in testosterone levels in the mother does not necessarily mean masculinization will occur. During a normal pregnancy, the testosterone level will increase slightly in the first and second trimester, but doubles in the third trimester. The testosterone level also depends on the sex of the fetus; male fetuses cause a bigger increase in testosterone levels than female fetuses.

Male fetuses, when carried by a mother who develops male characteristics from a luteoma, are not highly affected by the increase in testosterone in the mother due to this conditions. However, after birth, the male fetus may have abnormally high levels of testosterone, but this resolves itself. There have not been any ties between luteomas and the male infant producing high amounts of testosterone by itself.

Out of the 36% of women who show male characteristics from the luteoma, 75% of female fetuses will also show signs of masculinization. Female fetuses can have a variety of symptoms ranging from severe, requiring surgery, to mild, which resolves itself after birth. The severity of the symptoms a female fetus undergoes depends on when the exposure occurs and the duration of the exposure. If a female fetus is exposed to increased levels of testosterone in the first 7–12 weeks of the pregnancy, labioscrotal fusion and clitoromegaly can occur. These conditions would need correctional surgery if the infant was to be raised female. If testosterone exposure occurs after the first 12 weeks of pregnancy, no fusion will occur but the clitoris could still be enlarged. The enlarged clitoris usually corrects itself after birth and the abnormally high testosterone levels will decrease as the body produces its own hormones.

== Risk factors ==
Several conditions predispose a woman to forming a luteoma during pregnancy. Polyendocrine metabolic ovarian syndrome (PMOS) is one such condition. This syndrome is associated with high hormone levels and the failure of the ovaries to release an egg during the menstrual cycle, a symptom more often associated with menopause. The high levels of hormones in PMOS seem to predispose women to forming a luteoma during pregnancy. A characteristic of luteomas is that they grow better in the presence of high levels of hormones that function in normal growth, sexual development, and reproductive function. PMOS causes an excess of hormones in the body including some of the hormones related to these functions. Women who have already had a luteoma during a previous pregnancy have a higher high risk of having another luteoma. In this situation, women can be counseled on the risks of another pregnancy and their alternatives. Other risk factors associated with luteomas are multiple pregnancies, advanced maternal age, and Afro-Caribbean ethnicity.

== Diagnosis ==
Luteomas are not often detected before delivery. Most luteomas are found during surgery if a caesarean section is performed or when some other surgery is performed. Pre-delivery detection is not effective for many reasons. Some tests, that can be performed pre-delivery, measure the amount of testosterone in the blood; however, this is not a very useful detection method since normal pregnancies have increased amounts of testosterone. Another method that would be useful to determine if a fetus is being exposed to testosterone is to test the placenta and umbilical cord for testosterone. The placenta has a mechanism for converting hormones from the mother into hormones that the fetus needs. If the amount of testosterone in the umbilical cord is higher than normal, the gene type of the fetus should be determined to see if the fetus is male or female. If the fetus is female then the high levels of testosterone in the umbilical cord could be an indicator that a luteoma is present. This procedure cannot be safely performed until after the fetus has undergone differentiation (when the sex of the fetus becomes apparent). But by this time the damage has already been done.

== Treatment ==
No treatments for luteomas are currently available. The luteomas can be detected through ultrasound if masculinization is apparent in the mother. The fetus can be tested for gene type and if the fetus is female and the umbilical cord tests high for testosterone levels then the risks of masculinization of the fetus can be considered. Interventions cannot be made to change the outcomes, but the potential risks can be analyzed in order to make preparations. After the fetus is delivered the luteoma regresses on its own and only monitoring of the mother is needed after delivery. Depending on the sex of the fetus, exposure time and duration, the parents may need to decide if they will raise the child as male or female. Surgery may be necessary depending on what sex the child is going to be raised.
