= Endometrioid tumor =

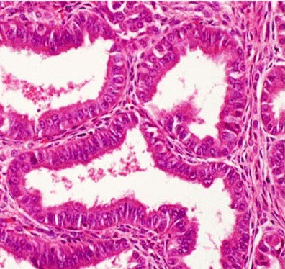
- Histopathology of a well-differentiated endometrioid adenocarcinoma in the ovary
- Specialty: Oncology, gynecology

Endometrioid tumors are a class of tumors that arise in the uterus or ovaries that resemble endometrial glands on histology. They account for 80% of endometrial carcinomas and 20% of malignant ovarian tumors.

== Ovary ==
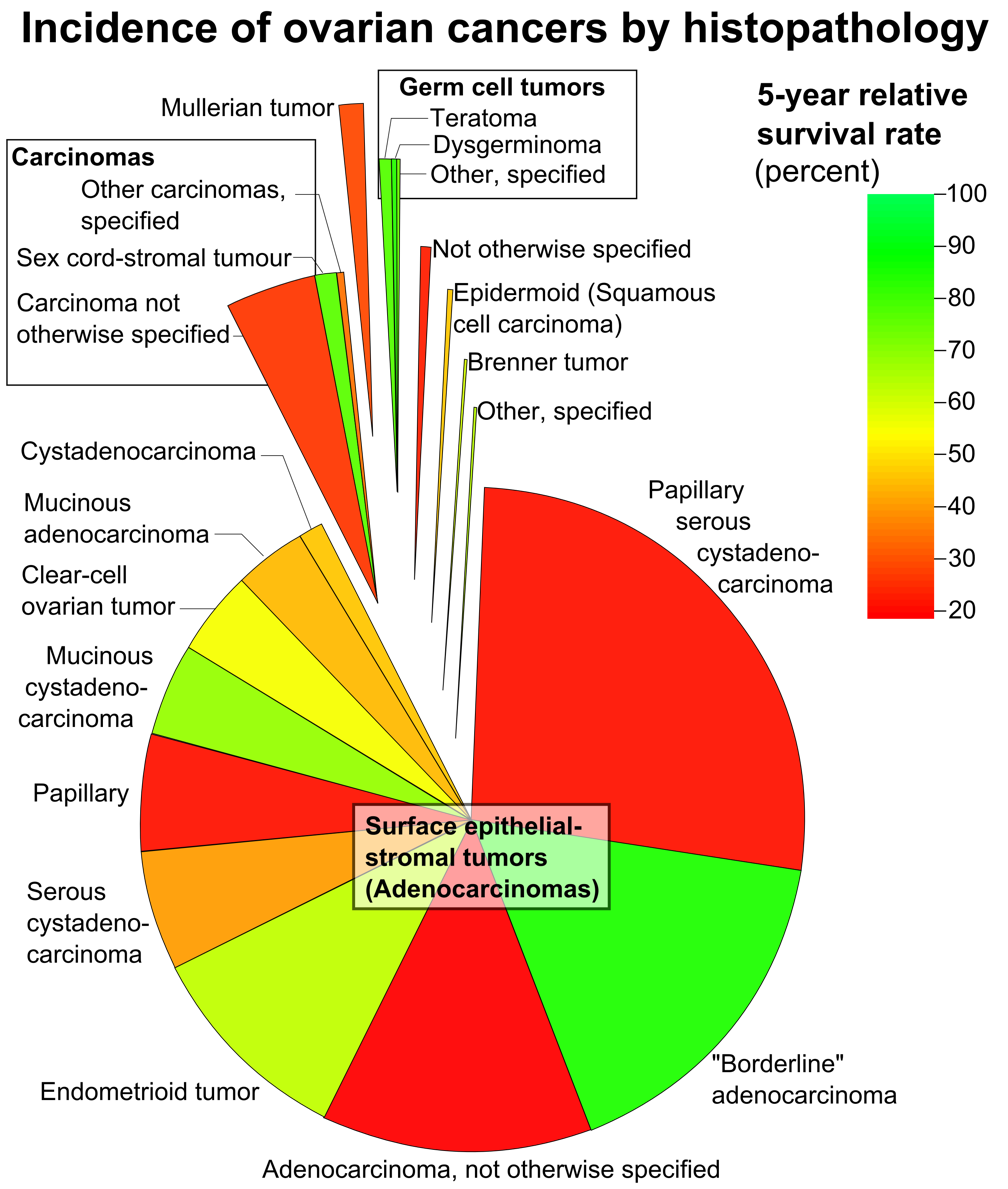
Ovarian cancers in women aged 20+, with area representing relative incidence and color representing 5-year relative survival rate. Endometrioid tumor is labeled at bottom left.

Ovarian endometrioid tumors are part of the surface epithelial tumor group of ovarian neoplasms (10–20% of which are the endometrioid type). Benign and borderline variants are rare, as the majority are malignant. There is an association with endometriosis and concurrent primary endometrial carcinoma (endometrial cancer).

On gross pathological examination, the tumor is cystic and may be solid and some arise in cystic endometriosis. In 40% of cases, endometrioid tumors are found bilaterally.

== Endometrium ==
Endometrioid carcinoma can also arise in the endometrium.

Grades 1 and 2 are considered "type 1" endometrial cancer, while grade 3 is considered "type 2".

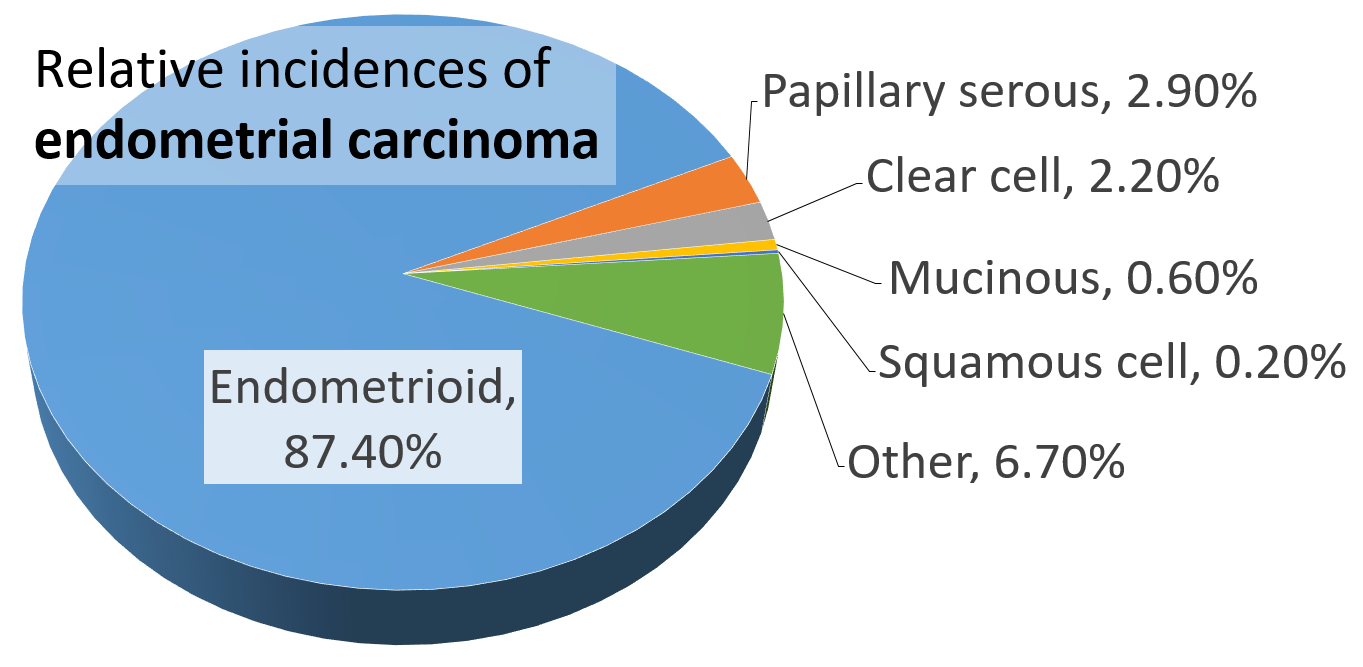
Relative incidences of endometrial carcinomas by histopathology, being endometrioid in a majority of cases

== Light microscopy ==
Light microscopy shows tubular glands, resembling endometrium.

== Molecular biology ==
=== CTNNB1 and PTEN mutations ===
Ovarian and endometrial endometrioid carcinomas have distinct CTNNB1 and PTEN gene mutation profiles. PTEN mutations are more frequent in low-grade endometrial endometrioid carcinomas (67%) compared with low-grade ovarian endometrioid carcinomas (17%). By contrast, CTNNB1 mutations are significantly different in low-grade ovarian endometrioid carcinomas (53%) compared with low-grade endometrial endometrioid carcinomas (28%). This difference in CTNNB1 mutation frequency may be reflective of the distinct tumoral microenvironments; the epithelial cells lining an endometriotic cyst within the ovary are exposed to a highly oxidative environment that promotes tumorigenesis.
