= Urogenital neoplasm =

- Specialty: Oncology, genitourinary oncology

A urogenital neoplasm is a tumor of the urogenital system.

== Types ==
Types include:

- Cancer of the female genital organs: (cervical cancer, endometrial cancer, ovarian cancer, uterine cancer, vaginal cancer, vaginal tumors, vulvar cancer)
- Cancer of the male genital organs (carcinoma of the penis, prostate cancer, testicular cancer)
- Cancer of the urinary organs (bladder cancer, renal cell carcinoma)
