= Anuria =

Absence of urine

- Other names: Anuresis
- Specialty: Nephrology

Anuria is nonpassage of urine, in practice is defined as passage of less than 100 milliliters of urine in a day. Anuria is often caused by failure in the function of kidneys. It may also occur because of some severe obstruction like kidney stones or tumours. It may occur with end stage kidney disease. It is a more extreme reduction than oliguria (hypouresis), with 100 mL/day being the conventional (albeit slightly arbitrary) cutoff point between the two.

== Signs and symptoms ==
Anuria itself is a symptom, not a disease. It is often associated with other symptoms of kidney failure, such as lack of appetite, weakness, nausea and vomiting. These are mostly the result of buildup of toxins in the blood which would normally be removed by healthy kidneys.

== Causes ==
Failure of kidney function, which can have multiple causes including medications or toxins (e.g., antifreeze, cephalosporins, ACEIs); diabetes; high blood pressure. Stones or tumours in the urinary tract can also cause it by creating an obstruction to urinary flow. High blood calcium, oxalate, or uric acid, can contribute to the risk of stone formation. In males, an enlarged prostate gland is a common cause of obstructive anuria.

Acute anuria, where the decline in urine production occurs quickly, is usually a sign of obstruction or acute kidney failure. Acute kidney failure can be caused by factors not related to the kidney, such as heart failure, mercury poisoning, infection, and other conditions that cause the kidney to be deprived of blood flow.

== Treatment ==
Treatment is dependent on the underlying cause of this symptom. The most easily treatable cause is obstruction of urine flow, which is often solved by insertion of a urinary catheter into the urinary bladder.

Mannitol is a medicine that is used to increase the amount of water removed from the blood and thus improve the blood flow to the kidneys. However, mannitol is contraindicated in anuria secondary to renal disease, severe dehydration, intracranial bleeding (except during craniotomy), severe pulmonary congestion, or pulmonary edema.

Dextrose and dobutamine are both used to increase blood flow to the kidney and act within 30 to 60 minutes.
