= Perinephritis =

Infection of the surroundings of the kidneys

Perinephritis is an infection of the surroundings of the kidney either right or left. It can be the result of extravasated infiltration of the bacteria out of the renal pelvis (pyelonephritis) or a result of another kidney infection. The consequences include the infection of the neighbouring organs (for example transverse colon) or retroperitoneum, and/or hypertension. Perirenal abscess also may occur.
