= Meigs's syndrome =

- Specialty: Gynecologic oncology

In medicine, Meigs's syndrome, also Meigs syndrome or Demons–Meigs syndrome, is the triad of ascites, pleural effusion, and benign ovarian tumor (ovarian fibroma, fibrothecoma, Brenner tumour, and occasionally granulosa cell tumour). Meigs syndrome resolves after the resection of the tumor. Because the transdiaphragmatic lymphatic channels are larger in diameter on the right, the pleural effusion is classically on the right side. The causes of the ascites and pleural effusion are poorly understood. Atypical Meigs syndrome, characterized by a benign pelvic mass with right-sided pleural effusion but without ascites, can also occur. As in typical Meigs syndrome, pleural effusion resolves after removal of the pelvic mass.

== Diagnosis ==
=== Differential diagnosis ===
Meigs syndrome may mimic other conditions, since it is tumor arising from ovaries, pathology of any organs present in the abdomen may show a similar set of symptoms. These include various gynecological disorders of the uterus such as endometrial tumor, sarcoma, leiomyoma (pseudo-Meigs syndrome); fallopian tube disorders such as hydrosalpinx, granulomatous salpingitis, fallopian tube malignancy; ovarian disorders such as serous, mucinous, endometrioid, or clear cell carcinoma, Brenner tumor, granulosa cell tumor, stromal tumor, dysgerminoma, fibroma, or metastatic tumor to the ovary.

Meigs syndrome is characterized by the presence of a benign solid ovarian tumor associated with ascites and right hydrothorax that disappear after tumor removal. Non-gynecological manifestations include: ascites, portal vein obstruction, inferior vena cava obstruction, hypoproteinaemia, thoracic duct obstruction, tuberculosis, amyloidosis, pancreatitis, ovarian hyperstimulation, exudate pleural effusion, congestive heart failure, metastatic tumors to the peritoneal surfaces, collagen-vascular disease, and cirrhosis of the liver.

These entities must be clinically excluded. Clinical condition characterized by ovarian mass, ascites, and right-sided pleural effusion. Ovarian malignancy and the other causes of pelvic mass, ascites, and pleural effusion to be considered, History of early satiety, weight loss with increased abdominal girth, bloating, intermittent abdominal pain, dyspnea, nonproductive cough may help in differentiating potential local factor causing such symptoms.

== Treatment ==
Treatment of Meigs syndrome consists of thoracentesis and paracentesis to drain off the excess fluid (exudate), and unilateral salpingo-oophorectomy or wedge resection to correct the underlying cause.

== Eponym ==
Meigs syndrome is named for Joe Vincent Meigs.
