= WAGR syndrome =

- Specialty: Oncology, obstetrics and gynaecology, urology, endocrinology, ophthalmology, neurology, medical genetics

WAGR syndrome (also known as WAGR complex, Wilms tumour-aniridia syndrome, aniridia-Wilms tumour syndrome) is a rare genetic syndrome in which affected children are predisposed to develop Wilms' tumour (a tumour of the kidneys), aniridia (absence of the coloured part of the eye, the iris), genitourinary anomalies, and intellectual disability. The "G" is sometimes instead given as "gonadoblastoma", since the genitourinary anomalies can include tumours of the gonads (testes or ovaries).

Some WAGR syndrome patients show severe childhood obesity and hyperphagia, and are categorised as WAGRO (adding obesity) which may be associated with the coinciding loss of brain-derived neurotrophic factor (BDNF) a gene that is also on chromosome 11.

The condition, first described by Miller et al. in 1964 in its association with other congenital malformations, results from a deletion on chromosome 11 resulting in the loss of several genes. As such, it is one of the best studied examples of a condition caused by loss of neighbouring (contiguous) genes.

It is possible for those with WAGR syndrome to develop Wilms' tumor, a rare form of kidney cancer.

== Signs and symptoms ==
Newborn children with WAGR syndrome are soon noted to have aniridia. The clinical suspicion for WAGR may be increased with the presence of other genital anomalies, though genitourinary anomalies are not always present, particularly in girls.

In older children, clinical diagnosis of the syndrome can be made when aniridia and one of the other features are present. While aniridia is rarely absent in WAGR syndrome, cases have been reported without it. Chromosomal analysis is necessary for definitive diagnosis. Other common eye defects include cataracts and ptosis. About 50% of people with WAGR syndrome develop Wilms' tumour.

== Pathophysiology ==
WAGR syndrome is caused by a mutation on chromosome 11 in the 11p13 region. Specifically, several genes in this area are deleted, including the PAX6 ocular development gene and the Wilms' tumour gene (WT1). Abnormalities in WT1 may also cause genitourinary anomalies. Mutations in the PAX6 gene have recently been shown to not only cause ocular abnormalities, but also problems in the brain and pancreas.

The gene for brain-derived neurotrophic factor (BDNF), located on 11p14.1, has been proposed as a candidate gene for the obesity and excessive eating in a subset of WAGR patients. This strengthens the case for a role for BDNF in energy balance.

== Diagnosis ==
Diagnosis for WAGR syndrome can be made by confirming microdeletion of 11p13 utilizing FISH (fluorescent in situ hybridization), the primary method of choice for diagnosis. FISH which will demonstrate a lack of a fluorescent signal coordinating to the specific location of the gene.

== Treatment ==
Children with WAGR syndrome receive regular (3-4 yearly) kidney surveillance for Wilms' tumour until at least the age of 6–8 years and thereafter remain under some follow-up because of the risk of late onset nephropathy (40% of patients with WAGR Syndrome over the age of 12 years). Females with WAGR syndrome may have streak ovaries, which can increase the risk for gonadoblastoma. Malformations of the vagina and/or uterus may also be present.

== See also ==
- Denys–Drash syndrome
