= Parametritis =

Infection of the parametrium (connective tissue near the uterus)

- Specialty: Gynecology

Parametritis (also known as pelvic cellulitis) is an infection of the parametrium (connective tissue adjacent to the uterus). It is considered a form of pelvic inflammatory disease.

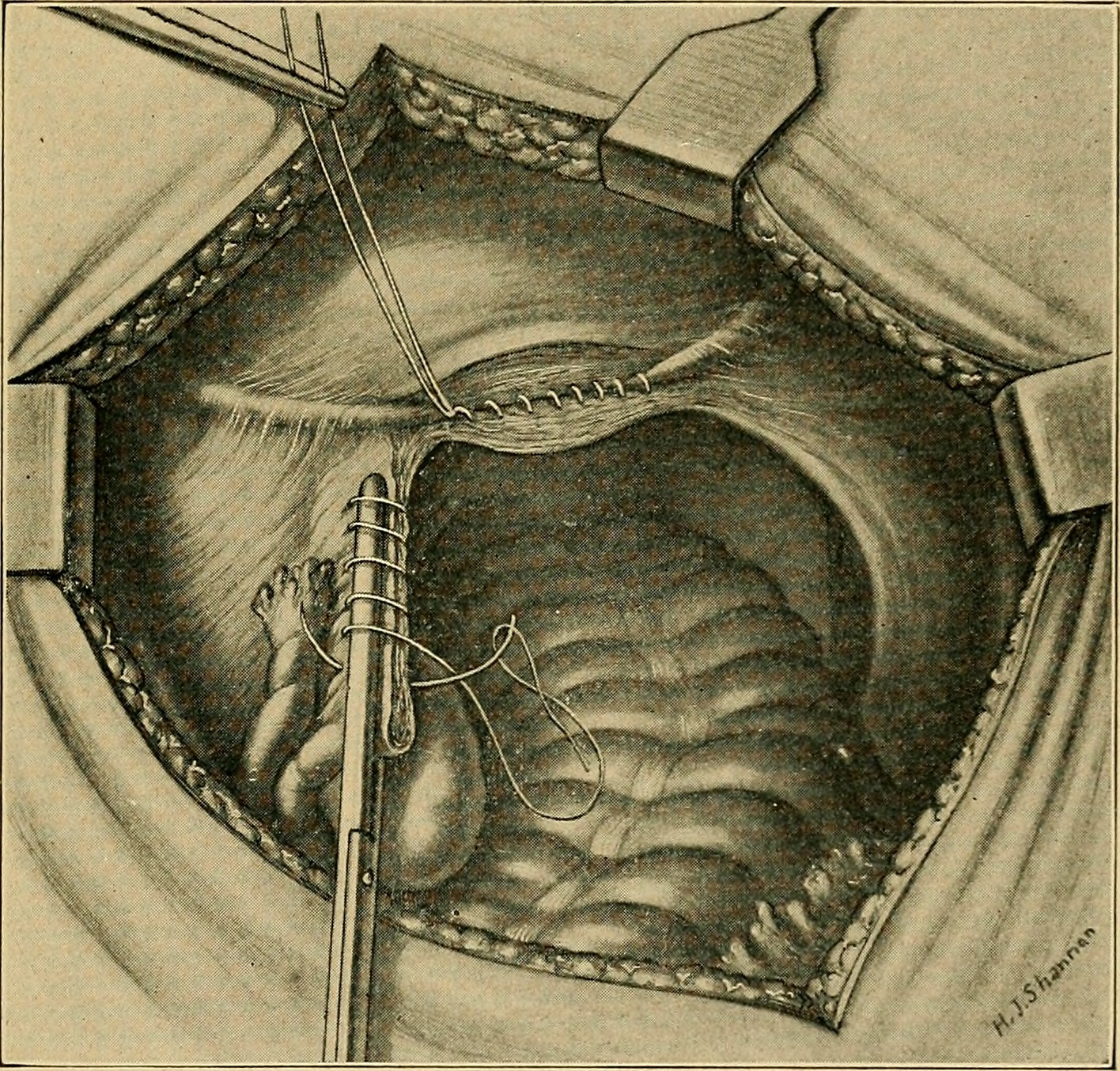
This is an image of pelvic inflammation in women commonly seen with PID.

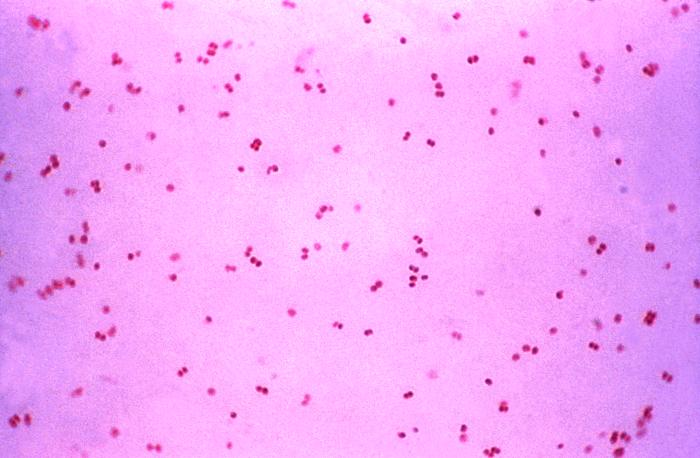
Gram-stain of gonococcal urethritis. Scientific classification: Domain: / Bacteria; Phylum: / Pseudomonadota; Class: / Betaproteobacteria; Order: / Neisseriales; Family: / Neisseriaceae; Genus: / Neisseria; Species: / N. gonorrhoeae; Binomial name Neisseria gonorrhoeae(Zopf 1885) Trevisan 1885 Synonyms Micrococcus der Gonorrhoe Neisser 1879; Gonococcus neisseri Lindau1898
