= Urogenital tuberculosis =

Tuberculosis of the renal and genital organs

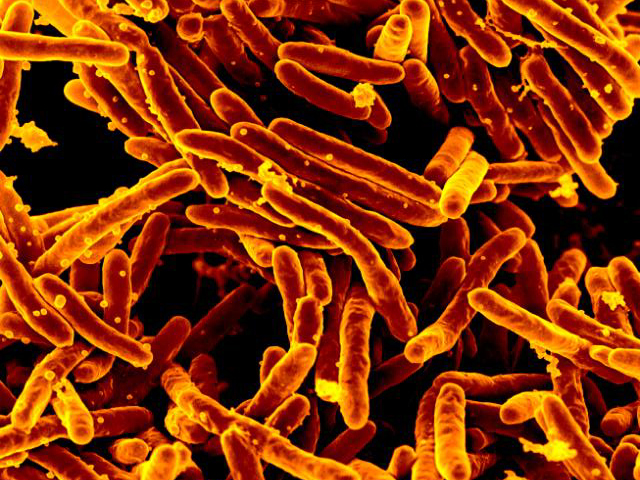
- Colorized electron microscope render of Mycobacterium tuberculosis
- Specialty: Infectious diseases, Urology
- Symptoms: Urinary storage symptoms, hematuria, sterile pyuria, flank or low back pain, scrotal anomalies (in males), fever, malaise
- Usual onset: 1 to 40+ years (average 22yrs) after resolution of pulmonary tuberculosis symptoms.
- Risk factors: History of known tuberculosis infection, other risk factors for tuberculosis, male sex
- Treatment: Standard four-drug regimen for tuberculosis

Urogenital tuberculosis, the second most frequent form of extrapulmonary tuberculosis, develops in 2-20% of patients with pulmonary tuberculosis through hematogenous spread to the kidneys, prostate, and epididymis. The disease follows a descending pattern, spreading through the collecting system to the ureters, bladder, and urethra, and through the ejaculatory ducts to the male sex organs. Though most prevalent in males in their fourth and fifth decades, it can occur at any age and in both males and females.

Characterized by its slow, gradual progression, urogenital tuberculosis often remains without symptoms until reaching advanced stages, frequently resulting in diagnostic delays and significant urogenital organ destruction. The condition's serious but insidious nature is evidenced by cases where renal failure constitutes the initial clinical presentation. Despite being well-recognized by specialists, urogenital tuberculosis remains largely underdiagnosed, even when suggestive findings such as hematuria, sterile pyuria, and recurrent urinary infections are present, highlighting the importance of improved awareness and early diagnosis to prevent progressive organ damage.

== Symptoms ==
Urogenital tuberculosis typically presents with nonspecific symptoms that develop gradually as the disease progresses, often leading to diagnostic delay. Unlike other bacterial urinary tract infections that typically respond to conventional antibiotics within days, urogenital tuberculosis manifests persistently despite standard treatments. The insidious nature of the disease means symptoms usually arise only after significant bladder involvement occurs. Among patients identified with urogenital tuberculosis infection via autopsy, approximately half were completely asymptomatic, and less than 1 in 5 had been diagnosed with urogenital tuberculosis. Importantly, symptoms may differ substantially in immunocompromised patients, who more frequently present with constitutional symptoms like fever and disseminated disease rather than classic urinary symptoms.

Common signs and symptoms of urogenital tuberculosis include:

- Storage symptoms (frequency, nocturia, urgency) - 50.5% of cases
- Hematuria - 35.6% of cases
- Low back pain - 34.4% of cases
- Scrotal abnormalities (lump, epididymal hardening, fistula) - present in up to 48.9% of male patients
- Fever and general malaise - 21.9% of cases
- Sterile pyuria (pus cells in urine with negative routine cultures)
- Recurrent urinary tract infections unresponsive to conventional antibiotics
- Contracted bladder with severely reduced capacity (in advanced cases)
- No urinary symptoms - 6.4% of diagnosed cases (more common in developed countries)

== Pathogenesis ==
Urogenital tuberculosis develops after hematogenous spread from an initial respiratory site of infection, with initial urogenital colonization occurring in the renal parenchyma, prostate, or epididymis. Following a latent period averaging 22 years (range: 1-46 years) after the primary pulmonary infection, reactivation typically occurs in a single kidney focus when immunity wanes, progressing to involve the collecting system. The infection then follows a predictable descending pattern: from the affected kidney to the ipsilateral ureter, causing multiple stenoses at anatomical narrowing-points; then to the bladder with progressive fibrosis potentially leading to a pathologically contracted bladder; and finally affecting the contralateral kidney through vesicoureteral reflux. The bladder damage reduces capacity and compliance while distorting the ureterovesical junctions, transforming the collecting system into an extension of the contracted bladder's capacity with ascending transmission of intravesical pressure. If left untreated, this sequential progression can lead to severe urogenital organ destruction, from unilateral renal loss to end-stage renal failure associated with contracted bladder. In both sexes but particularly in females, this can cause infertility.

In addition to the insidious, urogenital-specific presentation described above, renal and genital tuberculosis lesions may be a component of disseminated miliary tuberculosis.

== Diagnosis ==
Identification of Mycobacterium tuberculosis in urine through culture in Lowenstein-Jensen medium is the gold standard for diagnosing urogenital tuberculosis, though sensitivity varies widely (10.7-90%) and results take 6-8 weeks. PCR for M. tuberculosis in urine provides faster results (24-48 hours) with high sensitivity (94.3%) and specificity (85.7%), making it an ideal diagnostic tool for cases with few bacilli. Imaging techniques, particularly intravenous urography and CT scanning, are 91.4% sensitive, with the most suggestive findings being multiple stenoses of the collecting system from the renal pelvis to ureterovesical junction, which occur in 60-84% of cases.

== Treatment ==
Urogenital tuberculosis is generally treated with the same four-drug regimen used for pulmonary tuberculosis, consisting of isoniazid, rifampicin, ethambutol, and pyrazinamide. The standard treatment duration includes a two-month intensive phase with all four drugs followed by a four-month continuation phase with only isoniazid and rifampicin, for a total of six months. Some patients, however, may require longer treatment, particularly those with cavitary disease, kidney abscess, compromised renal function, or HIV co-infection, who may need 9-12 months of therapy. During treatment, patients should be monitored for complications such as upper urinary tract obstruction, which may develop as a paradoxical reaction in the first few weeks and require either corticosteroid treatment or surgical intervention. Treatment of multi-drug resistant tuberculosis is significantly more complex, requiring at least five effective drugs, including an injectable agent and a fluoroquinolone, with treatment lasting 18-24 months. Despite the challenges, the clinical response to antituberculous treatment is usually excellent due to high urinary concentrations of the drugs and good renal vascular supply, with sterilization of mycobacteria in urine typically occurring within two weeks of initiating treatment.

In the event of misdiagnosis due to failure to recognize the disease, or an attempt at treatment with standard antibiotic regimens for UTIs, the response to antibiotics is weak or nonexistent.

== Epidemiology ==
Urogenital tuberculosis, accounting for 30-40% of extrapulmonary tuberculosis cases, affects males twice as frequently as females (64.8% vs. 35.2%) with a mean age of 40.7 years, and shows higher prevalence and severity in developing countries where patients experience greater rates of organ damage. The typical male patient is in his fourth or fifth decade of life, while female genital tuberculosis primarily affects women of childbearing age (20-40 years).

Urogenital tuberculosis is common in Asia, but less common in sub-Saharan Africa.
