= Oophoritis =

Inflammation of the ovaries

- Specialty: Gynecology

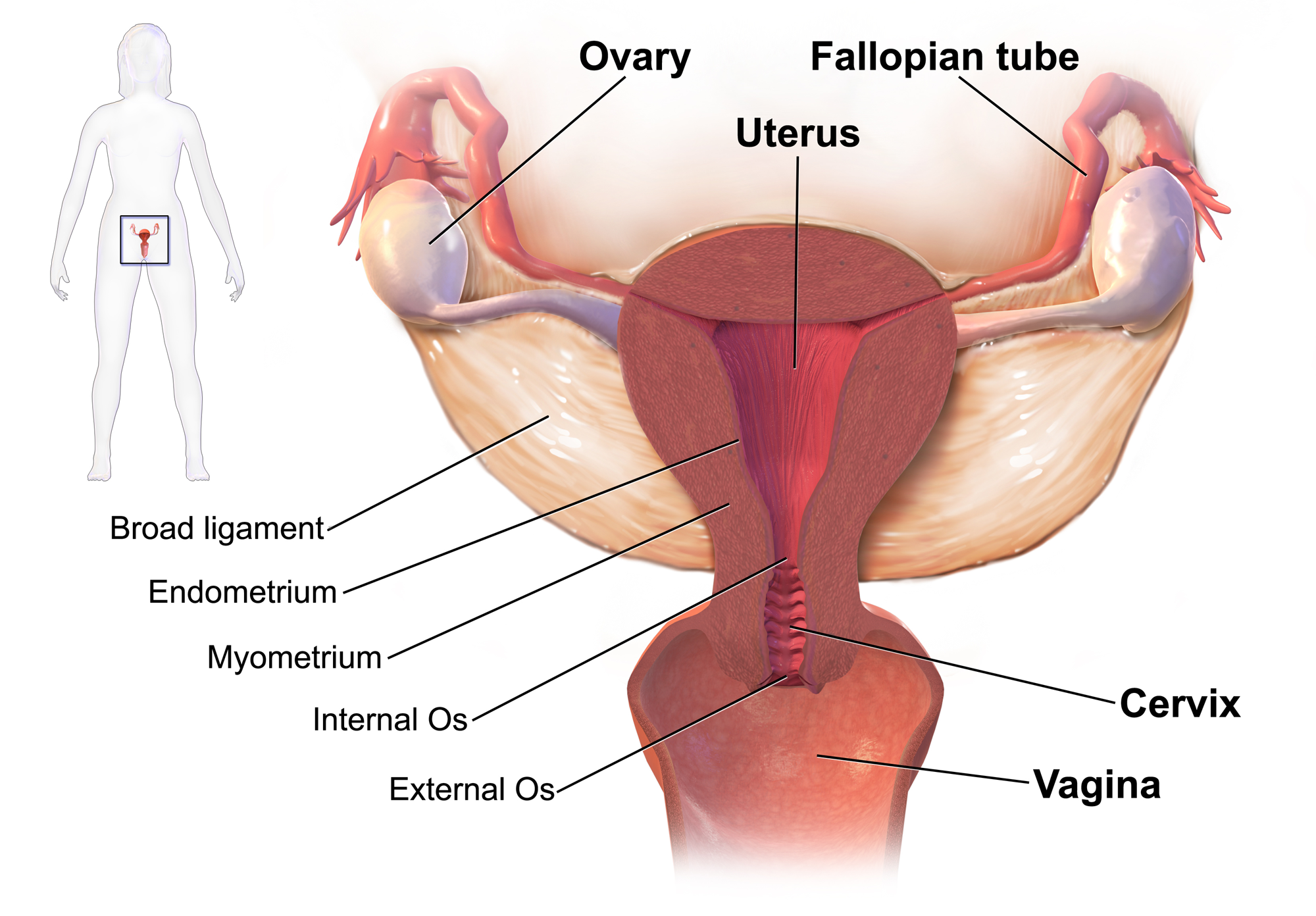
Standard Human Ovaries

Oophoritis is an inflammation of the ovaries.

It is often seen in combination with salpingitis (inflammation of the fallopian tubes). It may develop in response to infection. Oophoritis is typically caused by a bacterial infection, and may result from chronic pelvic inflammatory disease (PID). This form differs from autoimmune oophoritis, a disorder caused by a malfunction of the immune system.

== See also ==
- Pelvic inflammatory disease
