= Uterine cancer =

- Other names: Womb cancer
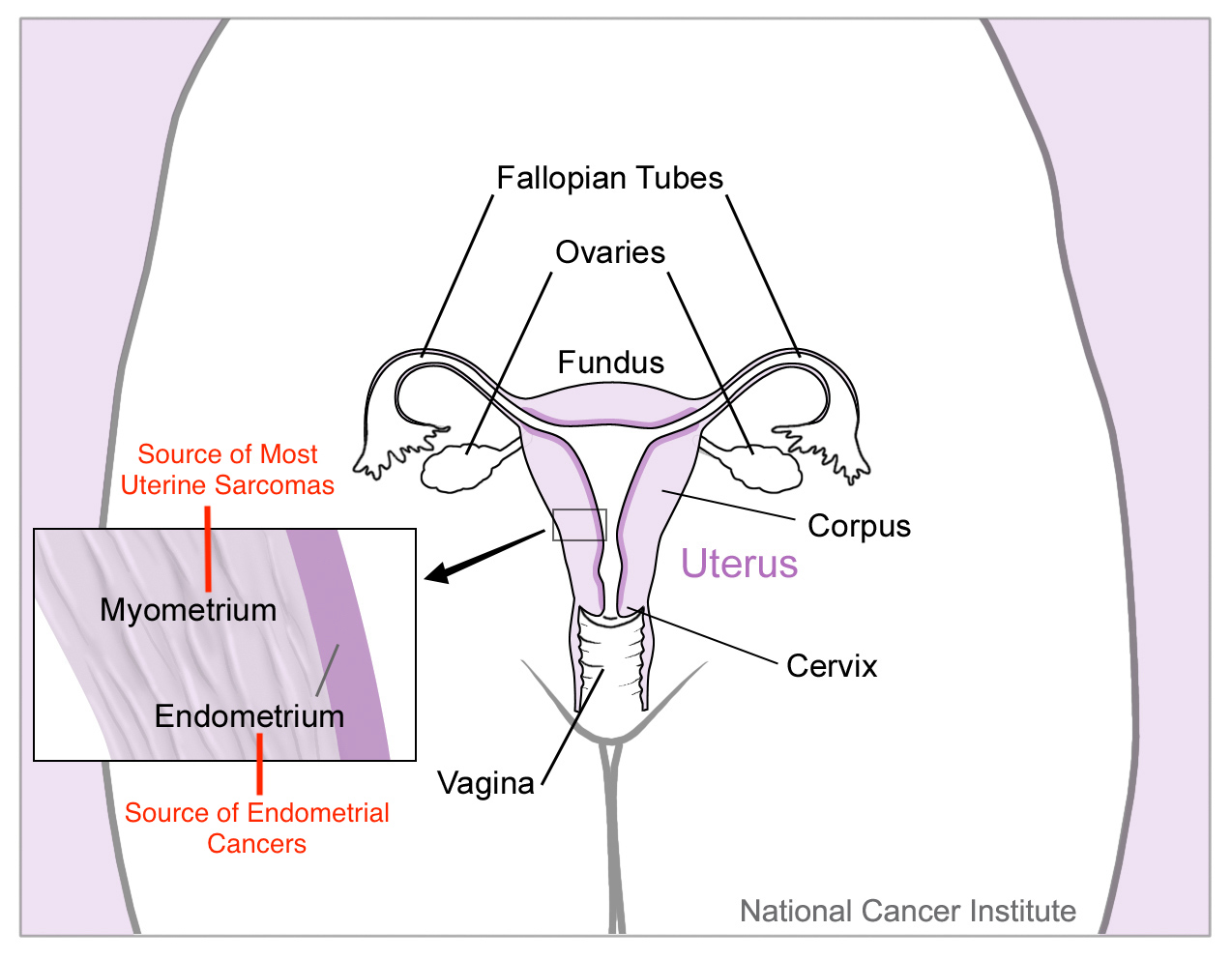
- Diagram of uterus with labeled origins of cancer types.
- Specialty: Gynecologic oncology
- Symptoms: Endometrial cancer: vaginal bleeding, pelvic pain Uterine sarcoma: vaginal bleeding, mass in the vagina
- Types: Endometrial cancer, uterine sarcoma
- Risk factors: Endometrial cancer: obesity, metabolic syndrome, type 2 diabetes, tamoxifen use, unopposed estrogens, late menopause, family history of the condition Uterine sarcoma: radiation therapy to the pelvis
- Treatment: Surgery, radiation therapy, chemotherapy, hormone therapy, targeted therapy
- Frequency: 3.8 million (2015)
- Deaths: 90,000 (2015)

Uterine cancer, also known as womb cancer, includes two types of cancer that develop from the tissues of the uterus. Endometrial cancer forms from the lining of the uterus, and uterine sarcoma forms from the muscles or support tissue of the uterus. Endometrial cancer accounts for approximately 90% of all uterine cancers in the United States. Symptoms of endometrial cancer include changes in vaginal bleeding or pain in the pelvis. Symptoms of uterine sarcoma include unusual vaginal bleeding or a mass in the vagina.

Risk factors for endometrial cancer include obesity, metabolic syndrome, type 2 diabetes, taking pills that contain estrogen without progesterone, a history of tamoxifen use, late menopause, and a family history of the condition. Risk factors for uterine sarcoma include prior radiation therapy to the pelvis. Diagnosis of endometrial cancer is typically based on an endometrial biopsy. A diagnosis of uterine sarcoma may be suspected based on symptoms, a pelvic exam, and medical imaging.

Endometrial cancer can often be cured while uterine sarcoma typically is harder to treat. Treatment may include a combination of surgery, radiation therapy, chemotherapy, hormone therapy, and targeted therapy. Just over 80% of women survive more than 5 years following diagnosis.

In 2015 about 3.8 million women were affected globally and it resulted in 90,000 deaths. Endometrial cancer is relatively common while uterine sarcomas are rare. In the United States, uterine cancers represent 3.4% of new cancer cases. They most commonly occur in women between the ages of 45 and 74 with a median age of diagnosis of 63.

== Types ==
The terms uterine cancer and womb cancer may refer to several different types of cancer that occur in the uterus, namely:

=== Endometrial cancer ===
- Endometrial carcinomas originate from cells in the glands of the endometrium (uterine lining). These include the common and readily treatable well-differentiated endometrioid adenocarcinoma, as well as the more aggressive uterine papillary serous carcinoma and uterine clear-cell carcinoma.
- Malignant mixed Müllerian tumors (also known as uterine carcinosarcomas) are rare endometrial tumors which show both glandular (carcinomatous) and stromal (sarcomatous) differentiation.

=== Uterine sarcomas ===
- Leiomyosarcomas originate from the muscular layer of the uterus (or myometrium). Of note, leiomyosarcomas are distinct from uterine leiomyomas, which are benign tumors of the uterus.
- Endometrial stromal sarcomas originate from the connective tissues of the endometrium, and are far less common than endometrial carcinomas.

== Signs and symptoms ==
Both types of uterine cancer can present with abnormal vaginal bleeding and discharge. Abnormalities can include change in duration or amount of menstrual bleeding as well as new bleeding between menses or after menopause. Sensations of new or increasing pelvic pressure or pain can also indicate tumor growth in the uterus. Any of these findings warrant further workup by a doctor.

== Causes and risk factors ==
It is not known with certainty what the causes for uterine cancer may be, though hormone imbalance is cited as a risk factor. Estrogen receptors, known to be present on the surfaces of cells of this type of cancer, are thought to interact with the hormone causing increased cell growth, which can then result in cancer. The exact mechanism of how this occurs is not understood.

Risk factors for endometrial cancer include obesity, metabolic syndrome, type 2 diabetes, taking pills that contain estrogen without progesterone, a history of tamoxifen use, late menopause, and certain hereditary conditions (Lynch syndrome, Cowden syndrome). Risk factors for uterine sarcoma include prior radiation therapy to the pelvis, a history of childhood retinoblastoma, and hereditary leiomyomatosis and renal cell carcinoma (HLRCC) syndrome.

== Diagnosis ==
To evaluate for uterine cancer, a clinician might perform a pelvic exam to visually inspect internal pelvic organs and to feel the size and position of the uterus and ovaries. A pap smear may also be done to brush the sides of the cervix to collect cells for testing and to look at under a microscope. A dilatation and curettage is often done to collect a sample of uterine lining tissue. An ultrasound is also often performed to look for tumors.

== Screening and prevention ==
Screening for uterine cancers is not recommended except for in women with certain hereditary conditions that increase their risk (Lynch, Cowden, HLRCC).

In general, combined oral contraceptive pills and progestin-only pills are protective against uterine cancers. Weight loss and/or bariatric surgery reduces the risk for patients with obesity.

== Treatment ==
Treatment of uterine cancer may differ depending on the type of cancer and staging of the tumor. In early stages, minimal invasive surgery is preferred.

For endometrial cancer, five main types of treatments are used, including surgery, radiation therapy, chemotherapy, hormone therapy, and targeted therapy. The most common treatment modality for endometrial cancer is surgery, whereby the uterus is removed via a total hysterectomy. Hysterectomies may also be accompanied by removal of ovaries and fallopian tubes, called a salpingo-oophorectomy. Additionally, hormone therapy which seeks to block the growth of cancer cells may also be used in the treatment of endometrial cancer. Targeted therapy may include monoclonal antibodies, mTOR inhibitors, and signal transduction inhibitors which all act to target cancer cells specifically.

As of 2021, treatment options for uterine sarcoma include surgery, radiation therapy, chemotherapy, and hormone therapy.

== Prognosis ==
Prognosis varies for the different types of endometrial cancer. Factors that influence prognosis across types of uterine cancer are age at diagnosis, the stage of the cancer, the grade of the cancer, histology, depth of invasion into the myometrium, and the presence of spread to nearby lymph nodes or other regions. Endometrial cancer typically has a good 5-year-survival when diagnosed early. Generally, the prognosis is poorer for uterine sarcomas as compared to endometrial cancers.

In the United States, about 81% of women with uterine cancer survive for five years. This rate is higher with more localized cancer at 95% and lower for a distant spread of the cancer, at a 19.6%. Black women had the highest mortality rate in the US, 9.8 deaths per 100,000 persons. The death rates for the other ethnic groups were lower. White females had 4.8 deaths per 100,000 persons, Hispanic females had 4.5 deaths per 100,000 persons, American Indian/Alaska Native females had 4.9 deaths per 100,000 persons, and Asian/Pacific Islander females had 3.5 deaths per 100,000 persons.

== Epidemiology ==
Age-standardized death from cancer of the uterine body per 100,000 inhabitants in 2004. no data less than 0.5 0.5–1 1–1.5 1.5–2 2–2.5 2.5–3 3–3.5 3.5–4 4–4.5 4.5–5 5–8 more than 8

Uterine cancer effects approximately 2.2% of females during their lifetime. Uterine cancer resulted in 45,000 deaths worldwide in 1990, with this number increasing to 58,000 deaths in 2010. North America and Northern Europe have the highest rates of uterine cancer. Asia, Southern Europe, Australia and South America have moderate rates, with the lowest rates in Africa and Eastern Asia.

=== United Kingdom ===
Uterine cancer is the fourth most common cancer in females in the UK (around 8,500 women were diagnosed with the disease in 2011), and it is the tenth most common cause of cancer death in females (around 2,000 women died in 2012).

=== United States ===
Uterine cancer has a high prevalence in the United States, with approximately 772,247 women with the disease in 2016. Of those uterine cancers, approximately 90% of the cases are endometrial cancers. This is the fourth most commonly diagnosed type of cancer.

In the United States, uterine cancer is the most common invasive gynecologic cancer. The number of women diagnosed with uterine cancer has been steadily increasing, with 35,040 diagnosed in 1999 and 56,808 diagnosed in 2016. The age-adjusted rate of new cases in 1999 was 23.9 per 100,000 and has increased to 27.3 per 100,000 in 2016. The incidence of uterine cancer increased even more in 2019, with an approximated 61,880 new cases.

== Research ==
As current diagnostic methods are invasive and inaccurate, researchers are looking into new ways to catch womb cancer, especially in its early stages. A study found that using a technique involving infrared light on simple blood test samples detected uterine cancer with high accuracy (87%), and could detect precancerous growths in all cases.
