= Uterine sarcoma =

Form of uterine cancer

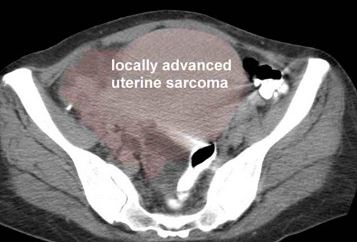

The uterine sarcomas form a group of malignant tumors that arises from the smooth muscle or connective tissue of the uterus. They can be difficult to detect, as symptoms are common to other uterine conditions and no specific screening test has been developed. This presents an issue for treatment, as the cancer spreads quickly.

Uterine sarcoma is rare and mostly occurs in post-menopausal women. The most common type, leiomyosarcoma, is twice as common in Black women as it is in white women. Uterine sarcoma condition is most commonly treated by radical hysterectomy. If cancer has spread beyond the uterus, radiation, chemotherapy, and hormonal therapy may be used.

If detected in its early stages, survival rates for uterine sarcoma are 66% after 5 years. If cancer has spread beyond the uterus, the survival rate declines to approximately 13-34%.

== Signs and symptoms ==
Clinically, uterine sarcomas and leiomyomas (fibroids) both have similar symptoms such as increased uterine size, abdominal pain and vaginal bleeding so it can be difficult to tell them apart. Unusual or postmenopausal bleeding may be a sign of uterine sarcoma and needs to be investigated. Other signs include pelvic pain, pressure, and unusual discharge. A nonpregnant uterus that enlarges quickly is suspicious. However, none of the signs are specific. Specific screening test have not been developed; a Pap smear is a screening test for cervical cancer and not designed to detect uterine sarcoma.

== Histology ==
Tumoral entities include leiomyosarcomas, endometrial stromal sarcomas, carcinosarcomas and "other" sarcomas.

- If the lesion originates from the stroma of the uterine lining it is an endometrial stromal sarcoma
- If the uterine muscle cell is the originator the tumor is a uterine leiomyosarcoma.
- Carcinosarcomas comprise both malignant epithelial and malignant sarcomatous components.

== Diagnosis ==
By using T2*-weighted imaging, MRI is able to differentiate distinguishing features of leiomyomas from uterine sarcomas. Investigations by the physician include imaging (ultrasound, CAT scan, MRI) and, if possible, obtaining a tissue diagnosis by biopsy, hysteroscopy, or D&C. Ultimately the diagnosis is established by the histologic examination of the specimen. Typically malignant lesions have >10 mitosis per high power field. In contrast, a uterine leiomyoma as a benign lesion would have < 5 mitoses per high power field.

=== Classification ===
Leiomyosarcomas are now staged using the 2009 FIGO staging system (previously they were staged like endometrial carcinomas) at the time of surgery.

- Stage I: tumor is limited to the uterus

IA: ≤5 cm in greatest dimension
IB: >5 cm

- Stage II: tumor extends beyond the uterus, but within the pelvis

IIA: involves adnexa of uterus
IIB: involves other pelvic tissues

- Stage III: tumor infiltrates abdominal tissues

IIIA: 1 site
IIIB: >1 site
IIIC: regional lymph node metastasis

- Stage IVA: invades bladder or rectum
- Stage IVB: distant metastasis (including intra-abdominal or inguinal lymph nodes; excluding adnexa, pelvic and abdominal tissues)

Endometrial stromal sarcomas and uterine adenosarcomas are classified as above, with the exception of different classifications for Stage I tumors.

- Stage I: the tumor is limited to the uterus

IA: limited to endometrium/endocervix
IB: invades <½ myometrium
IC: invades ≥½ myometrium

Finally, malignant mixed Müllerian tumors, a type of carcinosarcoma, are staged similarly to endometrial carcinomas.

- Stage I: the tumor is limited to the uterus

IA: invades <½ myometrium
IB: invades ≥½ myometrium

- Stage II: invades cervical stroma, but no extension beyond the uterus
- Stage III: local and/or regional spread

IIIA: invades uterine serosa and/or adnexa
IIIB: vaginal and/or parametrial involvement
IIIC: metastases to pelvic and/or paraaortic lymph nodes

IIIC1: positive pelvic nodes
IIIC2: positive para-aortic lymph nodes

- Stage IVA: invades bladder and/or bowel mucosa
- Stage IVB: distant metastases (including intra-abdominal metastases and/or inguinal lymph nodes)

== Management ==
Therapy is based on staging and patient condition and utilizes one or more of the following approaches.

Surgery is the mainstay of therapy if feasible involving total abdominal hysterectomy with bilateral salpingo-oophorectomy. Other approaches include radiation therapy, chemotherapy, and hormonal therapy.

Prognosis is relatively poor.

== Epidemiology ==
Uterine sarcoma is rare, out of all malignancies of the uterine body only about 4% will be uterine sarcomas. Generally, the cause of the lesion is not known, however, patients with a history of pelvic radiation are at higher risk. Most tumors occur after menopause.

Women who take long-term tamoxifen are at higher risk.

== See also ==
- Leiomyosarcoma
- Uterine fibroids
