= Phyllodes tumor =

Pyllodes tumor
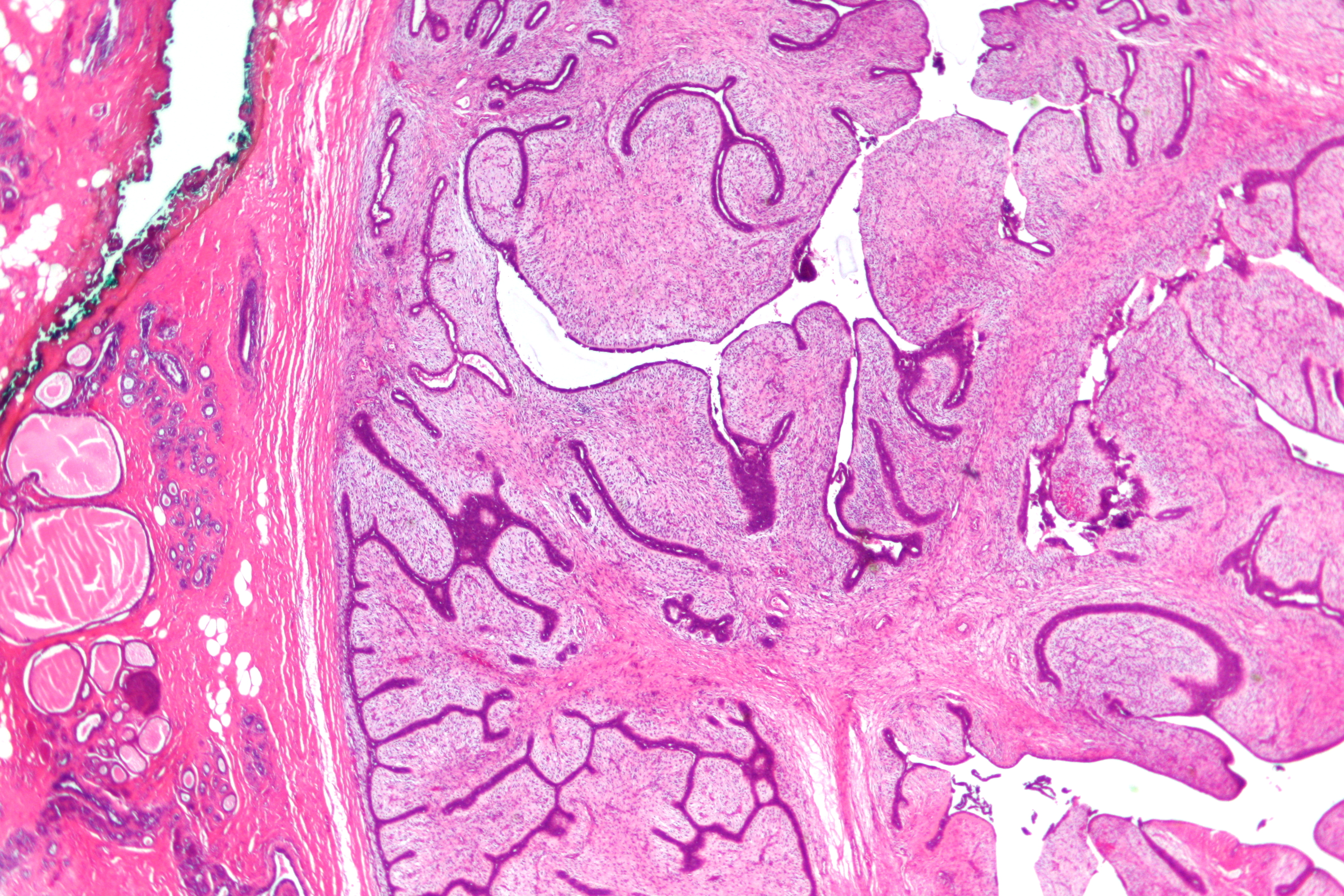
- Micrograph of a phyllodes tumor (right of image) with the characteristic long clefts and myxoid cellular stroma. Normal breast and fibrocystic change are also seen (left of image). H&E stain.

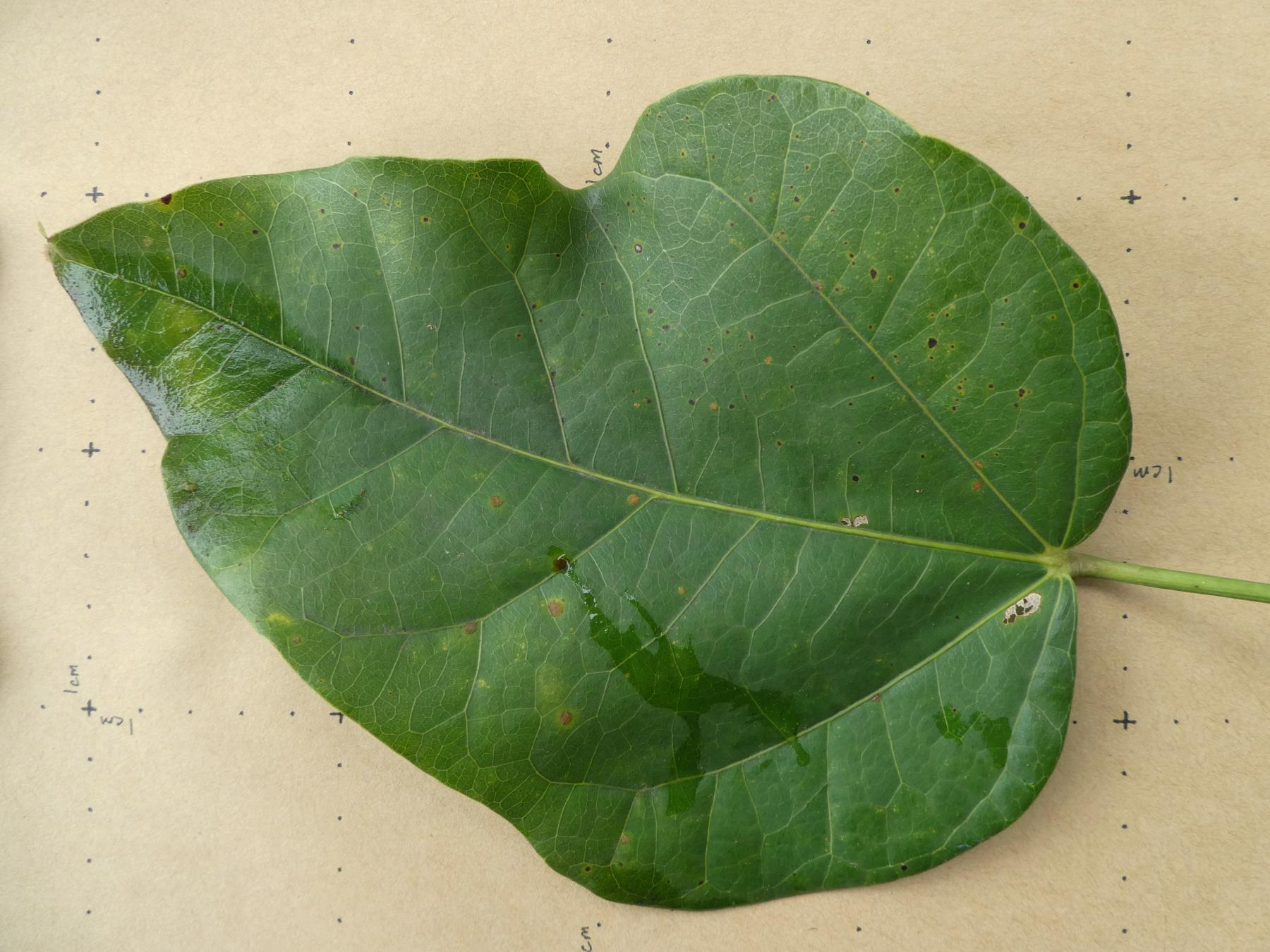
Phullon means 'leaf' in Greek. It is appropriately named to describe the characteristic papillary projections seen on histology in phyllodes tumors.

Phyllodes tumors (from Greek: phullon), are a rare type of biphasic fibroepithelial mass that form from the periductal stromal and epithelial cells of the breast. They account for less than 1% of all breast neoplasms. They were previously termed cystosarcoma phyllodes, coined by Johannes Müller in 1838, before being renamed to phyllodes tumor by the World Health Organization in 2003. Phullon, which means 'leaf' in Greek, describes the unique papillary projections characteristic of phyllodes tumors on histology. Diagnosis is made via a core-needle biopsy and treatment is typically surgical resection with wide margins (>1 cm), due to their propensity to recur.

== Signs and symptoms ==
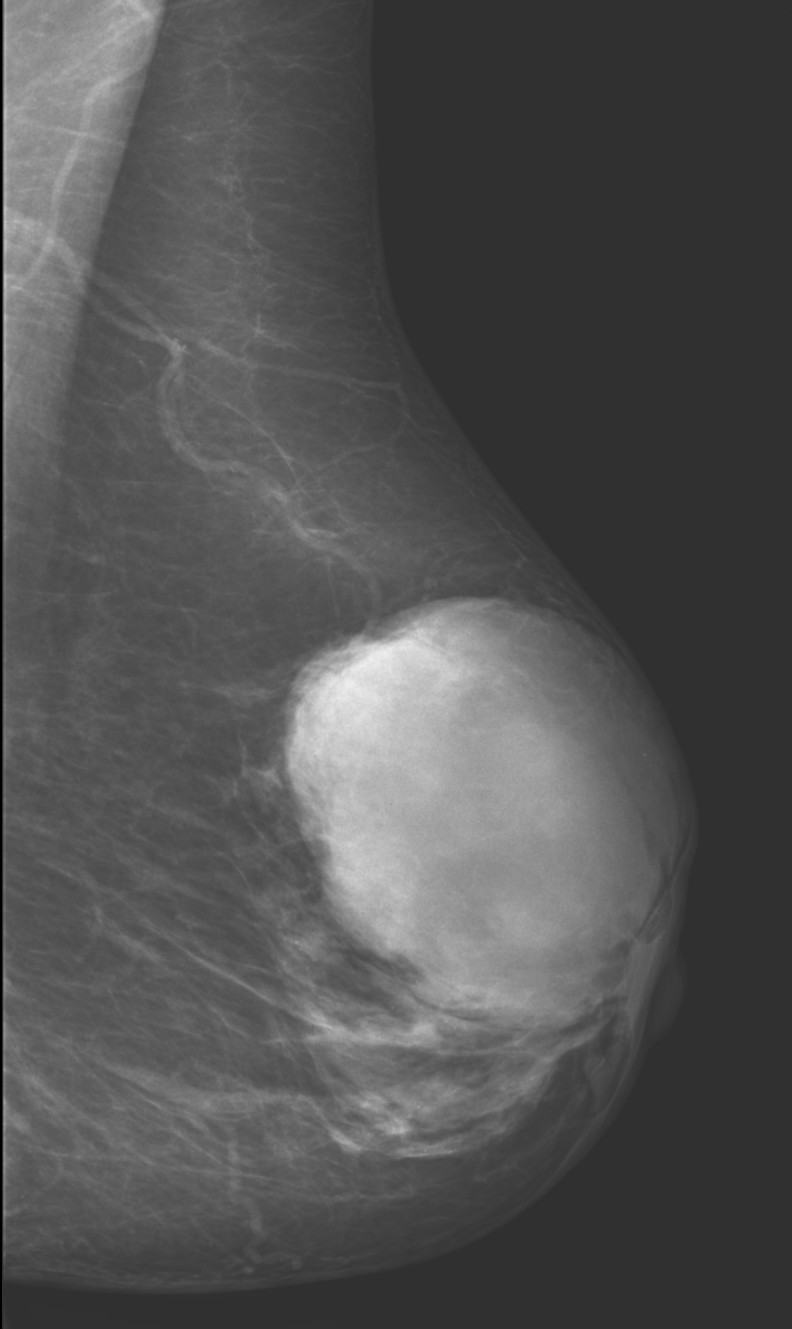
Phyllodes tumor in mammography

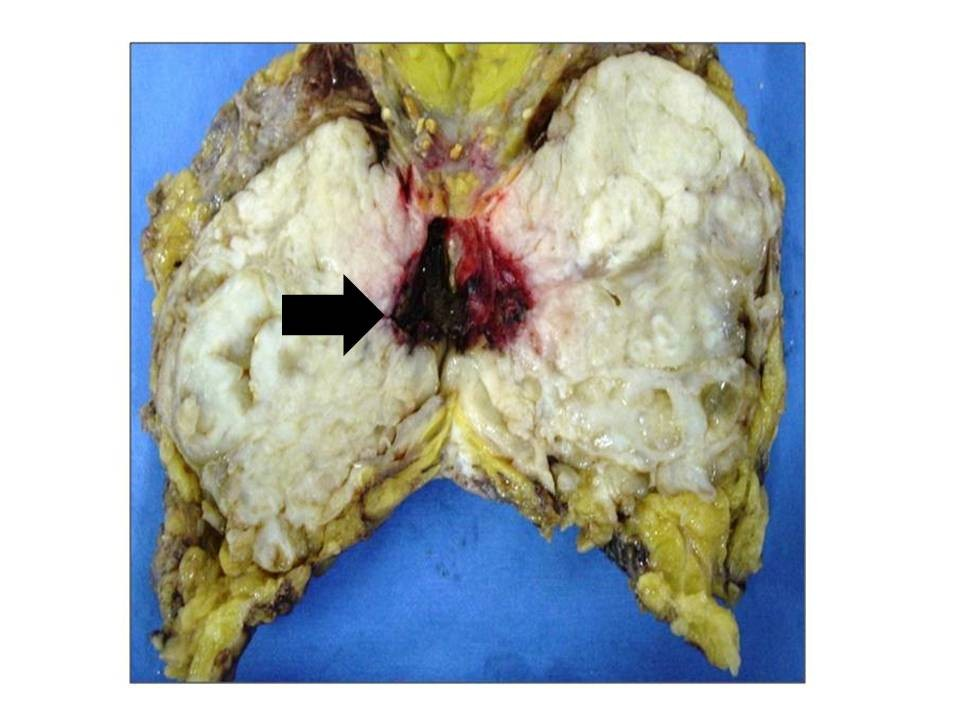
Anatomopathological results of phyllodes tumor.

Phyllodes tumors typically present as a firm, mobile, and palpable mass that is painless in nature. On physical examination, the mass can demonstrate a smooth or nodular texture depending on its size. In addition, larger masses can stretch the overlying breast tissue leading to nipple retraction, chest wall fixation, and in advanced cases, ulceration from pressure necrosis.

Phyllodes tumors can grow to a variety of sizes, ranging from 0.8 to 40 cm, with the average tumor growing to between 4 and 8 cm. Their growth can be slow, rapid, or demonstrate alternating growth patterns. A notable feature, however, is that their growth rarely regresses, a distinguishing feature from fibroadenomas which tend to change in size based on a female's menstrual cycle.

== Causes ==
Experts are unsure of the exact etiology of phyllodes tumors. Genetically, phyllodes tumors have shown to have a higher incidence with conditions such as Li-Fraumeni syndrome and BRCA1/BRCA2 mutations. In addition, males with a history of gynecomastia have shown an increased incidence of developing a phyllodes tumor.

== Mechanism ==
The pathogenesis behind the development of a phyllodes tumor is not well-defined. Some theories suggest a genetic cause while other literature supports the involvement of hormone and growth factor receptors, cell signal transduction pathways, and cell cycle markers. Certain receptors include estrogen/progesterone, glucocorticoid, and HER2. The most well-studied cell signal transduction pathway includes the Wnt pathway, which is a highly conserved genetic pathway between species. In the Wnt pathway, gene transcription via B-catenin is a highly regulated process by proteins including, but not limited to, c-myc, c-jun, Fra, and cyclin D1. Mutation of any these proteins can lead to the un-regulated, rapid growth characteristic of phyllodes tumors.

In addition, vascular factors promoting angiogenesis have been shown to further promote growth of these breast masses. These proteins include vascular endothelial growth factor (VEGF), Hypoxia-inducible factor-1a, Platelet-derived growth factor, endothelin-1, and nitrogen oxide synthase. The increased expression of these angiogenic factors reflects the increased angiogenesis seen in higher grade phyllodes tumors.

Genes that have been associated with a higher incidence of phyllodes tumors include Mediator Complex Subunit 12 (MED12) exon 2, Telomerase Reverse Transcriptase (TERT) promoter, and Retinoic Acid Receptor Alpha (RARA); important genes for regulating DNA synthesis.

The current theory behind the development of phyllodes tumors involves the interaction between each of these pathways to some degree and how they alter the normal interaction of the breast epithelial-stromal tissue.

== Diagnosis ==
=== Diagnostic techniques ===
Radiographical imaging is the first-line test for identifying a phyllodes tumor. Despite their propensity to grow rapidly and deform the overlying breast tissue, approximately 20% of phyllodes tumors can present as a nonpalpable mass on screening mammography. Other imaging tools used to assess the size and spread of a phyllodes tumor include ultrasound and magnetic resonance imaging (MRI). None of these imaging tools are definitive tests for differentiating a phyllodes tumor from a benign fibroadenoma. Phyllodes tumors can only be diagnosed histologically, as they tend to have many overlapping features with other breast masses on physical examination and radiological imaging.

A core needle biopsy is the primary tool used to provide a definitive diagnosis for phyllodes tumors. Other biopsy techniques include fine-needle aspiration and excisional biopsy. Following biopsy, histological and gross examination is performed which helps clinicians better grade and classify the phyllodes tumor.

=== Classification ===
Phyllodes tumors are part of a group of breast diseases called cellular fibroepithelial lesions. This term incorporates a spectrum of diseases ranging from a benign fibroadenoma to a malignant phyllodes tumor, with numerous variants in between. They are classified by ICD-O, not by MeSH.

Phyllodes tumors may be considered benign, borderline, or malignant depending upon their histological features, including stromal cellularity, infiltration of the epithelial-stromal interface, and mitotic activity. Due to their propensity to metastasize and grow quickly, almost all phyllodes tumors are regarded as having malignant potential and treated accordingly. A large case series from the MD Anderson Cancer Center reported the incidence of each type of phyllodes tumor as benign (58%), borderline (12%), and malignant (30%).

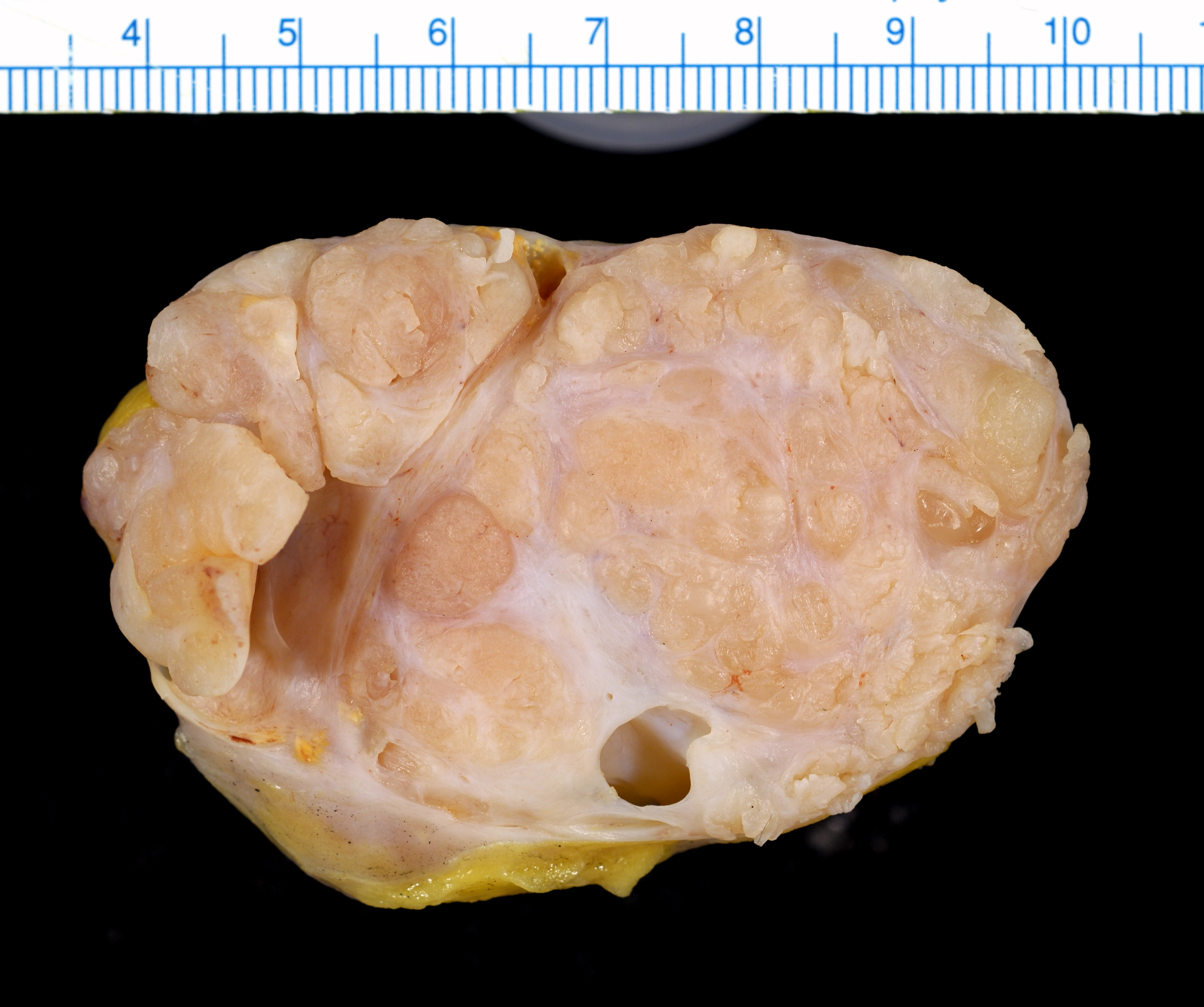
Gross image of an excised phyllodes tumor.

Malignant phyllodes tumors can behave similarly to sarcomas leading to development of blood-borne metastases. Approximately 10% of phyllodes tumor develop distant metastases and this occurrence is higher (20%) in patients with histological-identified malignant tumors. The most common site for distant metastases include the lung, bone, and abdominal viscera. In more insidious cases, the parotid region has also been described in literature.

Histopathologic classification
	Benign	Borderline	Malignant
Margin	Pushing		Infiltrating
Stromal atypia	Minimal	Moderate	Severe
Mitoses per 10 HPF	<5	5 to 9	≥10
Stromal overgrowth	Absent	Present	

== Prevention and screening ==
There is no evidence-based recommendations for screening or preventative measures for early detection of phyllodes tumors.

In patients with a prior history of a phyllodes tumor, the follow-up recommendations are employed on a case-by-case basis depending upon the grade and stage of the treated tumor.

Patients who have not had a mastectomy should continue regular breast cancer screening based on the recommendations by the United States Preventative Services Task Force.

== Treatment ==
The most common, curative treatment for a phyllodes tumor is wide surgical excision with greater than 1 cm margins. Other than surgery, there is no definite cure for a phyllodes tumor as chemotherapy and radiation therapy have not proven effectiveness. The risk of developing local recurrence or metastases is related the histologic grade and mitotic activity of the tumor. Despite proper surgical excision, a high percentage of surgeries performed to treat a phyllodes tumor demonstrate incomplete excision margins that require additional revision surgery. Radiation treatment, after breast-conserving surgery with negative margins, may significantly reduce the local recurrence rate for borderline and malignant tumors. A study performed in 2012 derived a risk calculator for relapse risk of phyllodes tumors after surgery.

== Prognosis ==
The prognosis of phyllodes tumor is good with an overall 87% 10-year survival rate. After wide-margin surgical excision, 98.7% of benign phyllodes tumors and 80% of borderline were cured. In rare cases where the tumor has metastasized, the prognosis is poor. This most commonly occurs in cases of malignant grade phyllodes tumor.

== Epidemiology ==
Phyllodes tumors account for approximately 1% of all breast neoplasms. They primarily occur in adult women, with very few examples reported in adolescents. Incidence is most common between the ages of 40 and 50, prior to the onset of menopause. For comparison, this is about 15 years older than the typical age of patients with a fibroadenoma, a common differential diagnosis in patients with a suspected phyllodes tumors. Younger women have a higher chance of having a benign phyllodes tumor, while older women are more likely to have higher-grade tumors.
