= Fibroadenoma =

- Other names: Breast mice, breast mouse
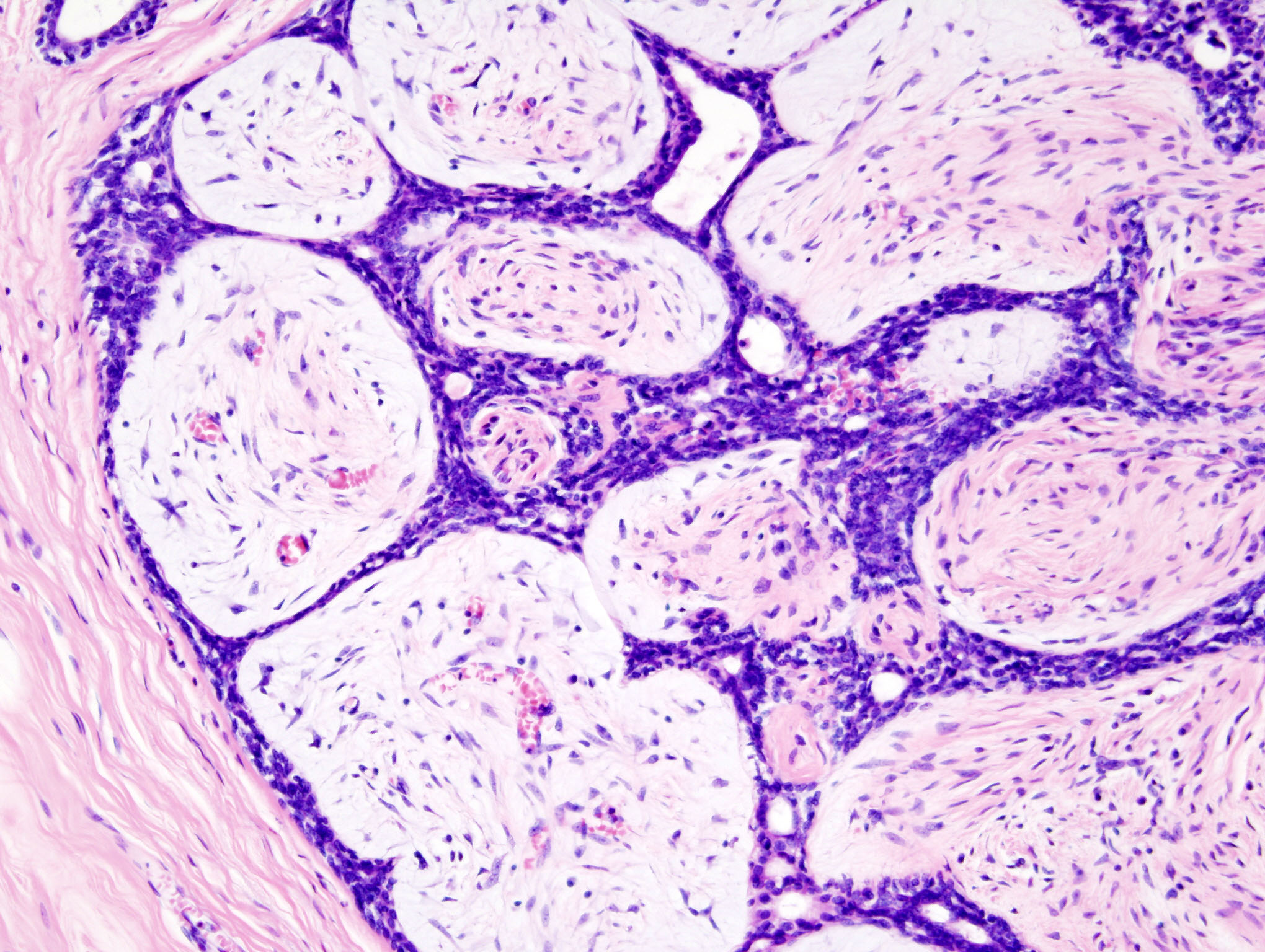
- Histopathologic image of breast fibroadenoma. Core needle biopsy. H&E stain.
- Specialty: Gynecology

Fibroadenomas are benign breast tumours characterized by an admixture of stromal and epithelial tissue. Breasts are made of lobules (milk producing glands) and ducts (tubes that carry the milk to the nipple). These are surrounded by glandular, fibrous and fatty tissues. Fibroadenomas develop from the lobules. The glandular tissue and ducts grow over the lobule to form a solid lump.

Since both fibroadenomas and breast lumps as a sign of breast cancer can appear similar, it is recommended to perform ultrasound analyses and possibly tissue sampling with subsequent histopathologic analysis in order to make a proper diagnosis. Unlike typical lumps from breast cancer, fibroadenomas are easy to move, with clearly defined edges.

Fibroadenomas are sometimes called breast mice or a breast mouse owing to their high mobility in the breast.

== Signs and symptoms ==
Fibroadenomas are benign tumours of the breast, most often present in women in their 20s and 30s. Clinically, fibroadenomas are usually solid breast lumps that are:

- Painless
- Firm or rubbery
- Mobile
- Solitary-round with distinct, smooth borders

People who have a simple fibroadenoma likely do not have an increased risk of developing malignant (harmful) breast cancer compared to the general population. Complex fibroadenomas may increase the risk of breast cancer slightly.

In the male breast, fibroepithelial tumors are very rare, and are mostly phyllodes tumors. Exceptionally rare case reports exist of fibroadenomas in the male breast; however, these cases may be associated with antiandrogen treatment. In transgender women using feminizing hormone therapy fibroadenomas may develop and be identical to those in cisgender women's breasts; conversely, in transgender men using masculinizing hormone therapy for at least a year the incidence decreases.

== Cause ==
The cause of fibroadenoma is unknown (idiopathic). A connection between fibroadenomas and reproductive hormones has been suggested which may explain why they present themselves during reproductive years, increase in size during pregnancy, and regress post-menopause.

Higher intake of fruits and vegetables, higher number of live births, lower use of oral contraceptives and moderate exercise are associated with lower frequency of fibroadenomas.

=== Pathology ===
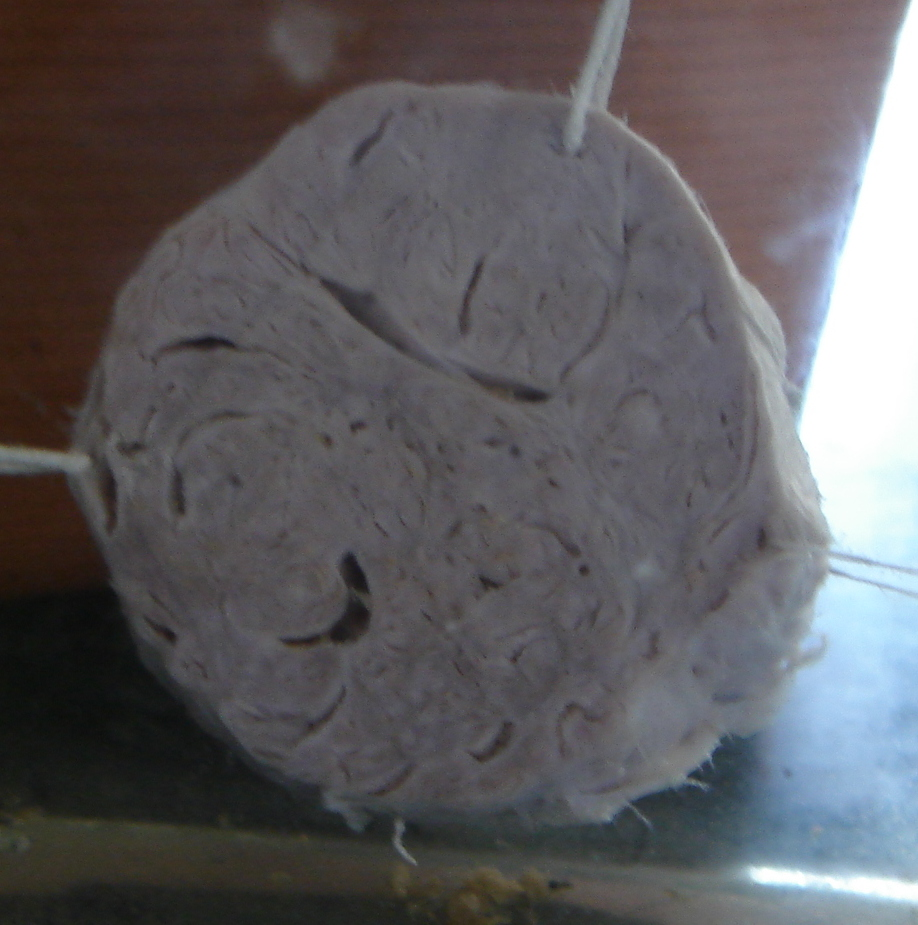
Macroscopic view of fibroadenoma of the breast

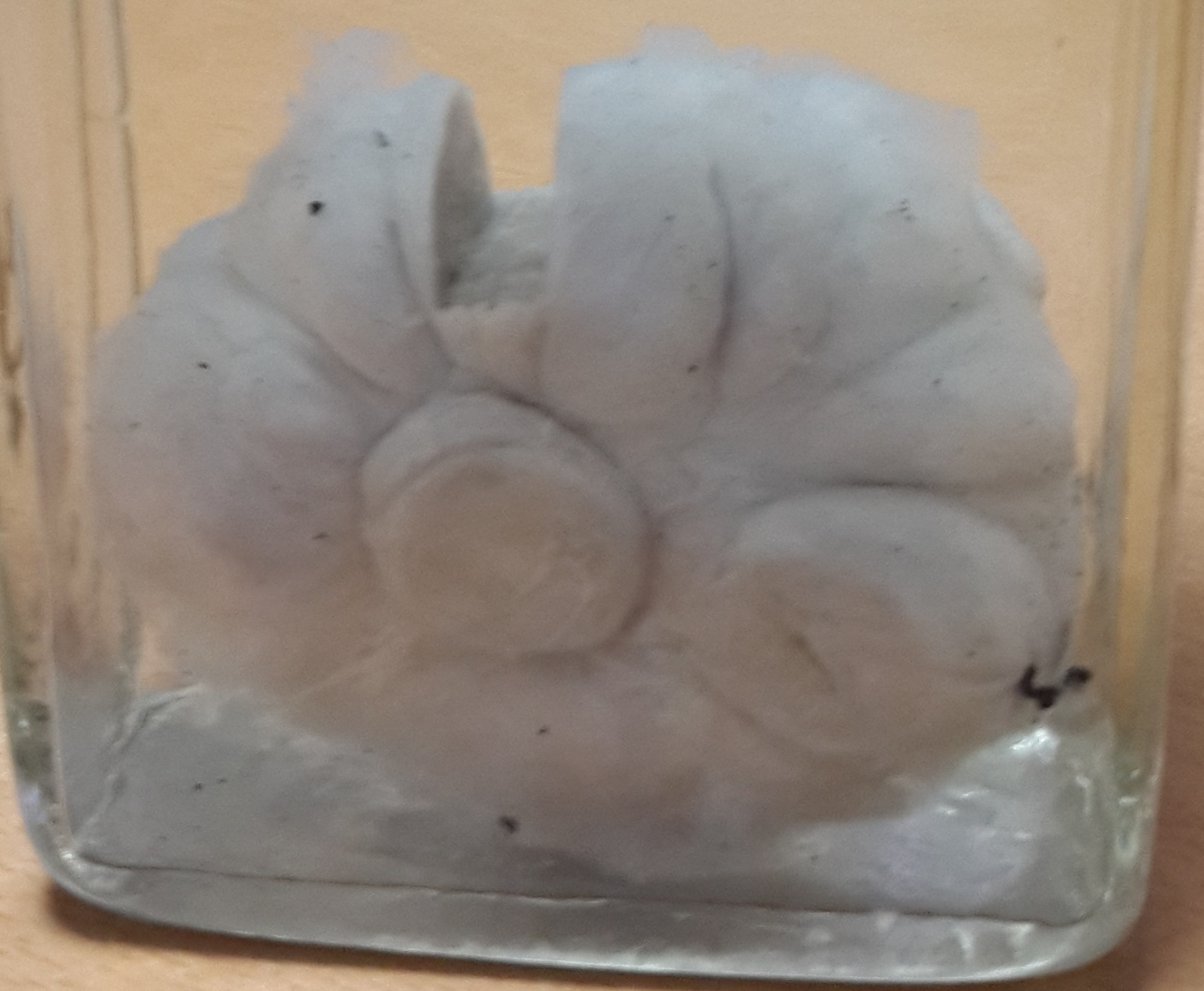
Closeup of a fibroadenoma of the breast

=== Cytology ===
The diagnostic findings on needle biopsy consist of abundant stromal cells, which appear as bare bipolar nuclei, throughout the aspirate; sheets of fairly uniform-size epithelial cells that are typically arranged in either an antler-like pattern or a honeycomb pattern. These epithelial sheets tend to show typical metachromatic blue on Diff-Quik staining. Foam cells and apocrine cells may also be seen, although these are less diagnostic features. The gallery images below demonstrate these features.

Cellular fibroadenoma, also known as juvenile fibroadenoma, is a variant type of fibroadenoma with increased stromal cellularity.

=== Macroscopic ===
Approximately 90% of fibroadenomas are less than 3 cm in diameter. However, these tumors have the potential to grow reaching a remarkable size, particularly in young individuals. The tumor is round or ovoid, elastic, and nodular, and has a smooth surface. The cut surface usually appears homogenous and firm, and is grey-white or tan in colour. The pericanalicular type (hard) has a whorly appearance with a complete capsule, while the intracanalicular type (soft) has an incomplete capsule.

=== Microscopic ===
Fibroadenoma of the breast is a benign tumor composed of a biplastic proliferation of both stromal and epithelial components. This biplasia can be arranged in two growth patterns: pericanalicular (stromal proliferation around epithelial structures) and intracanalicular (stromal proliferation compressing the epithelial structures into slit-like spaces).

These tumors characteristically display hypovascular stroma compared to malignant neoplasms. Furthermore, the epithelial proliferation appears in a single terminal ductal unit and describes duct-like spaces surrounded by a fibroblastic stroma. The basement membrane is intact.

== Molecular pathology ==
Up to 66% of fibroadenomas harbor mutations in the exon (exon 2) of the mediator complex subunit 12 (MED12) gene. In particular, these mutations are restricted to the stromal component.

== Diagnosis ==
A fibroadenoma is usually diagnosed through clinical examination, ultrasound or mammography, and often a biopsy sample of the lump. Suspicious findings on imaging may result in a person needing a biopsy in order to gain a definitive diagnosis. There are three types of biopsies: fine-needle aspiration, core-needle biopsy and surgical biopsy. The method of biopsy depends on the appearance, size and location of the breast mass.

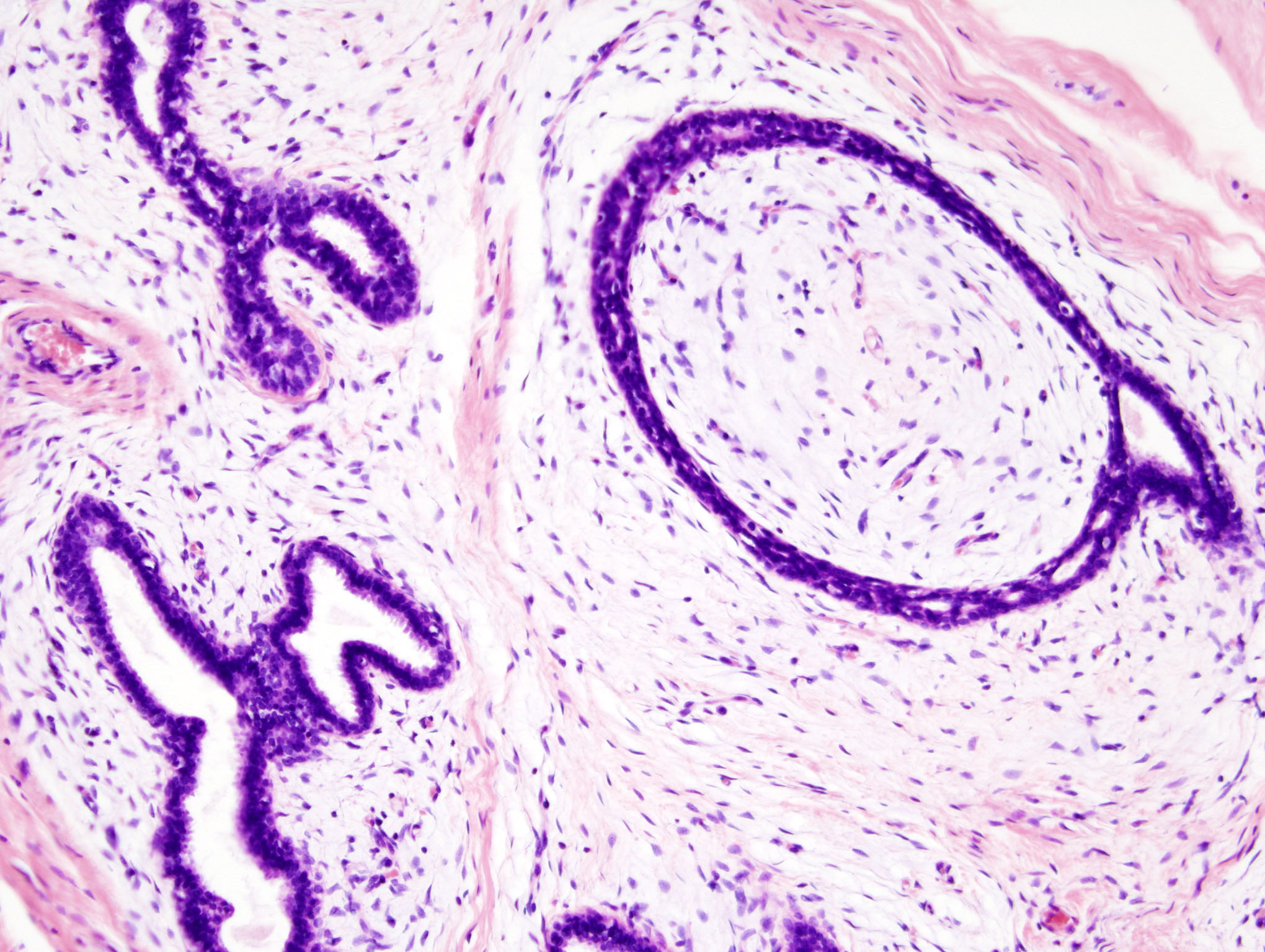
Fibroadenoma histology (H&E). The image demonstrates intracanalicular morphology (bottom left) and pericanalicular morphology (top right)

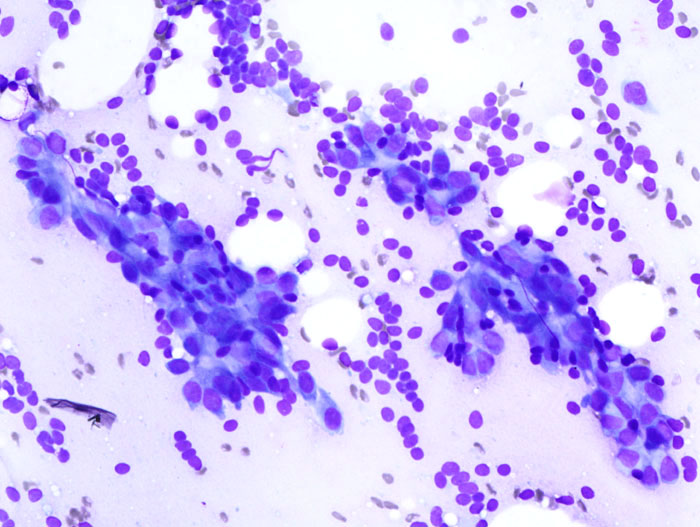
Fibroadenoma, fine needle aspiration biopsy (Giemsa or DiffQuick stain). The image shows abundant bare bipolar stromal nuclei surrounding sheets of metachromatic epithelial cells.

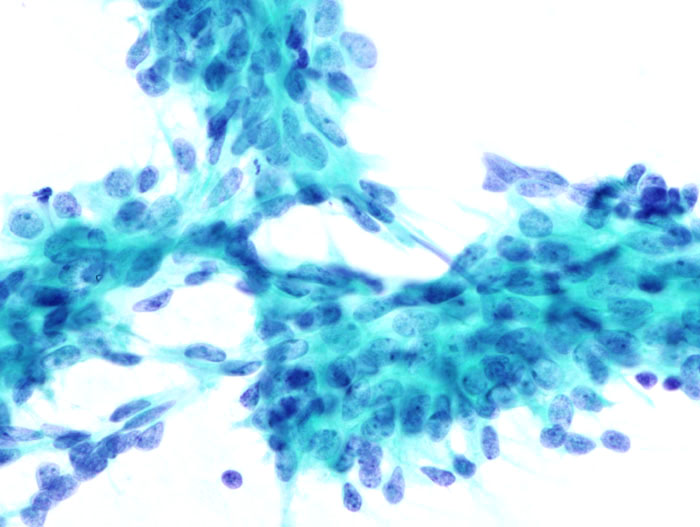
Fibroadenoma, fine needle aspiration biopsy (Papanicolou stain). The image shows a sheet of epithelial cells in the typical antler pattern.

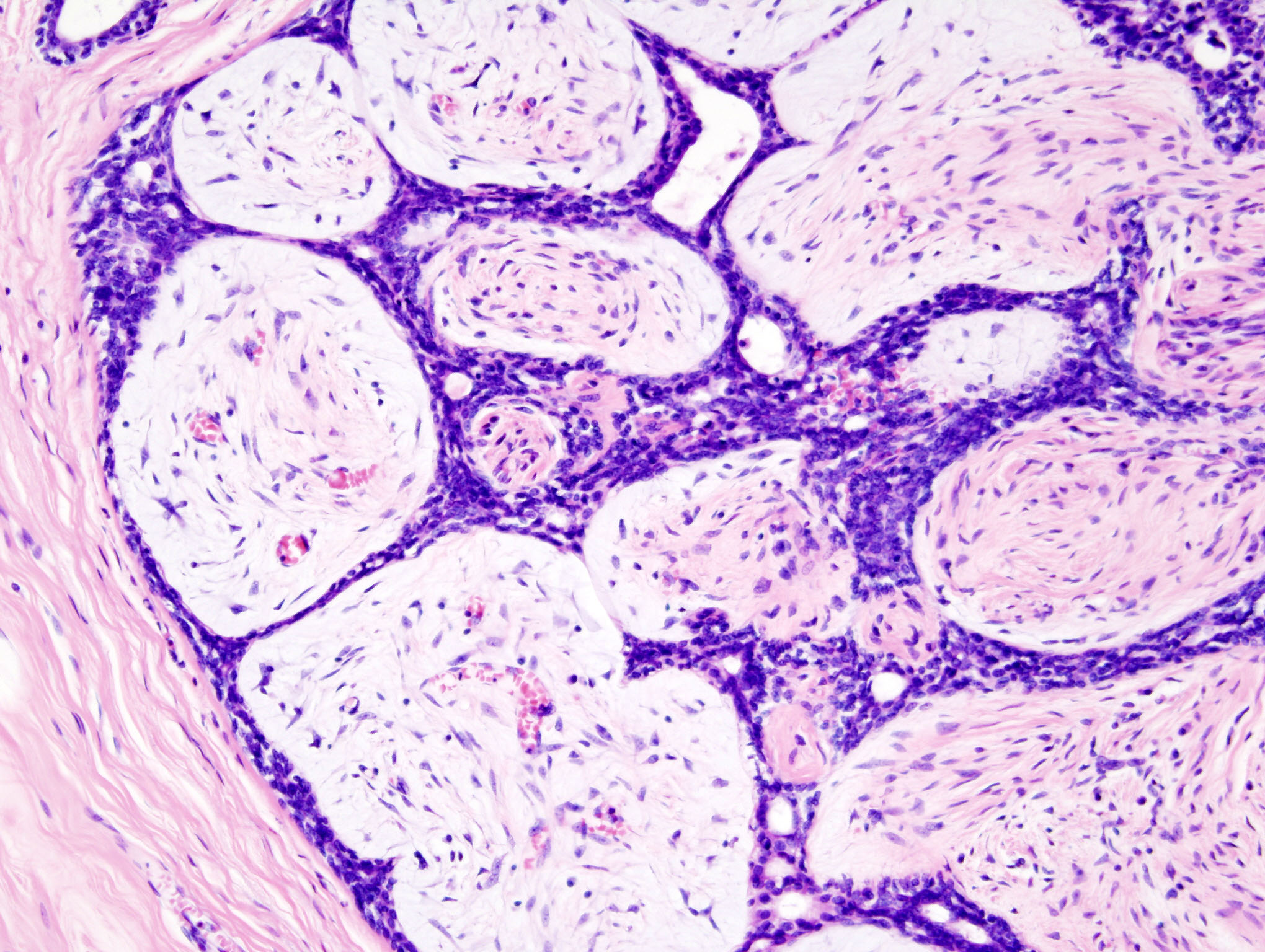
Histopathologic image of breast fibroadenoma. Core needle biopsy. Hematoxylin & eosin stain.

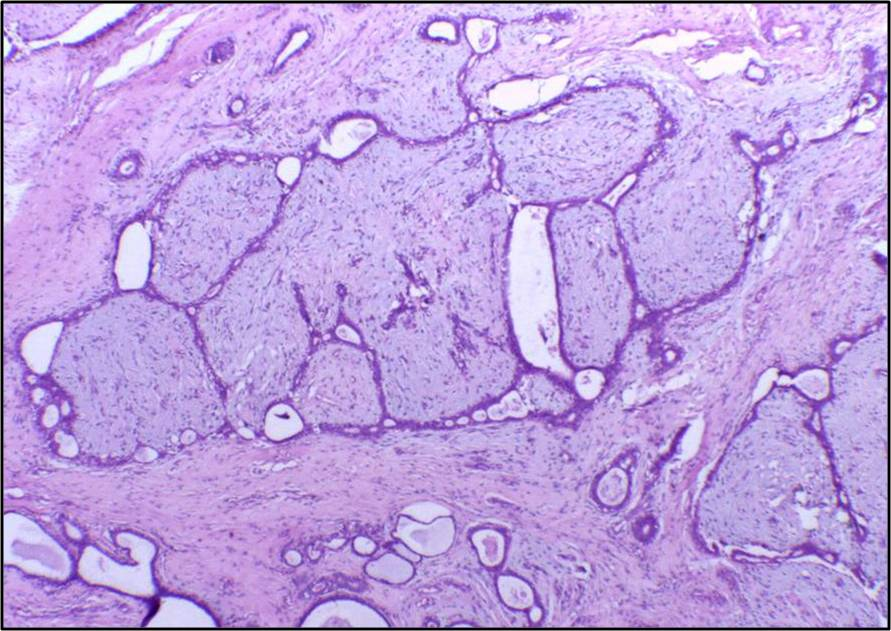
Histopathologic image of breast fibroadenoma showing proliferation of intralobular stroma compressing and distorting the epithelium. H&E stain.

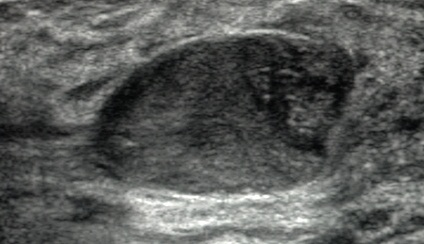
Fibroadenoma in ultrasound

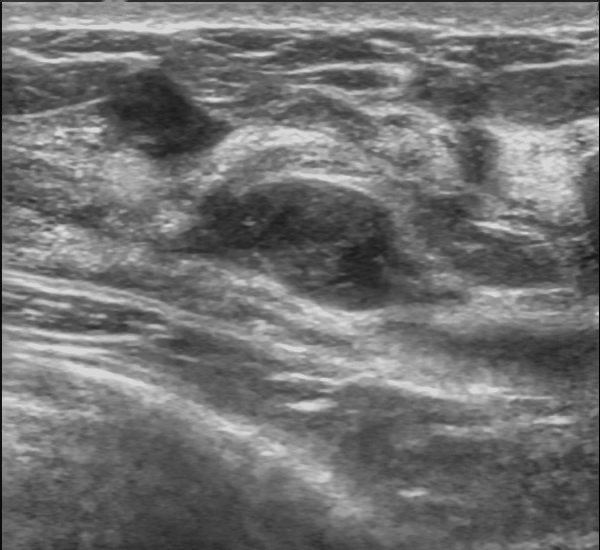

== Treatment ==
Fibroadenomas can be expected to shrink naturally, so most are simply monitored. Monitoring fibroadenomas involves regular check-ups to make sure that the breast mass is not growing and is not potentially cancerous. Check-ups involve physical examinations performed every 3–6 months and optional diagnostic imaging performed every 6–12 months for 1–2 years. Generally, surgery is only recommended if the fibroadenoma gets larger or causes increased symptoms. They are removed with a small margin of normal breast tissue if the preoperative clinical investigations are suggestive of the necessity of this procedure. A small amount of normal tissue must be removed in case the lesion turns out to be a phyllodes tumour on microscopic examination.

Because needle biopsy is often a reliable diagnostic investigation, some doctors may decide not to operate to remove the lesion, and instead opt for clinical follow-up to observe the lesion over time using clinical examination and mammography to determine the rate of growth, if any, of the lesion. A growth rate of less than sixteen percent per month in women under fifty years of age, and a growth rate of less than thirteen percent per month in women over fifty years of age have been published as safe growth rates for continued non-operative treatment and clinical observation.

Some fibroadenomas respond to treatment with ormeloxifene.

Fibroadenomas have not been shown to recur following complete excision or transform into phyllodes tumours following partial or incomplete excision.

=== Non-invasive surgical interventions ===
There are several non-invasive options for the treatment of fibroadenomas, including percutaneous radiofrequency ablation (RFA), cryoablation, and percutaneous microwave ablation. With the use of advanced medical imaging, these procedures do not require invasive surgery and have the potential for enhanced cosmetic results compared with conventional surgery.

==== Cryoablation ====
The FDA approved cryoablation of a fibroadenoma as a safe, effective, and minimally-invasive alternative to open surgical removal in 2001. During cryoablation, ultrasound imaging is used to guide a probe into the mass of breast tissue. Extremely cold temperatures are then used to destroy the abnormal cells, and over time the cells are reabsorbed into the body. The procedure can be performed as an outpatient surgery using local anesthesia, and leaves substantially less scarring than open surgical procedures and no breast tissue deformation.

The American Society of Breast Surgeons recommends the following criteria to establish a patient as a candidate for cryoablation of a fibroadenoma:

1. The lesion must be sonographically visible.
2. The diagnosis of a fibroadenoma must be confirmed histologically.
3. The lesion should be less than 4 cm in diameter.

==== High-intensity focused ultrasound ====
High-intensity focused ultrasound (HIFU) is a newer technique for the treatment of malignant and benign tumors of the breast and has shown promising results in the form of complete radiological removal of tumors. An ultrasound beam is focused on a target in the breast and leads to tissue death and protein degradation by raising the temperature in that area. Currently, the use of radiation is recommended in some cases, but HIFU in particular is not part of treatment guidelines. Further research into the usefulness of HIFU, specifically in fibroadenoma, is required before more widespread use of the technique in fibroadenoma.

== Epidemiology ==
Of all breast tissue samples taken, fibroadenomas comprise about 50%, and this rate rises to 75% for tissue sample in women under the age of 20 years. Fibroadenomas are more frequent among women in higher socioeconomic classes and darker-skinned people. Body mass index and the number of full-term pregnancies were found to have a negative correlation with the risk of fibroadenomas. There are no known genetic factors that influence the rate of fibroadenomas. The rate of occurrence of fibroadenomas in women has been reported in literature to range from 7% to 13%.
