= Annals of Surgical Oncology =

- Discipline: Surgery, oncology
- Language: English
- Edited by: Kelly M. McMasters

Publication details
- History: 1994–present
- Publisher: Springer Science+Business Media on behalf of the Society of Surgical Oncology
- Frequency: 13/year
- Impact factor: 5.344 (2020)

Standard abbreviations
- ISO 4: Ann. Surg. Oncol.

Indexing
- ISSN: 1068-9265 (print); 1534-4681 (web)
- OCLC no.: 397372574

Links
- Journal homepage; Online access; Online archive; Journal page at publisher's website

Annals of Surgical Oncology is a peer-reviewed medical journal published by Springer International Publishing on behalf of the Society of Surgical Oncology. It is an official journal of the Society of Surgical Oncology, and the American Society of Breast Surgeons. The editor-in-chief is Kelly M. McMasters (University of Louisville School of Medicine).

== Abstracting and indexing ==
The journal is abstracted and indexed in Index Medicus/MEDLINE/PubMed, Current Contents/Clinical Medicine, Excerpta Medica, and the Science Citation Index. According to the Journal Citation Reports, the journal has a 2020 impact factor of 5.344.
