= Endometrial stromal nodule =

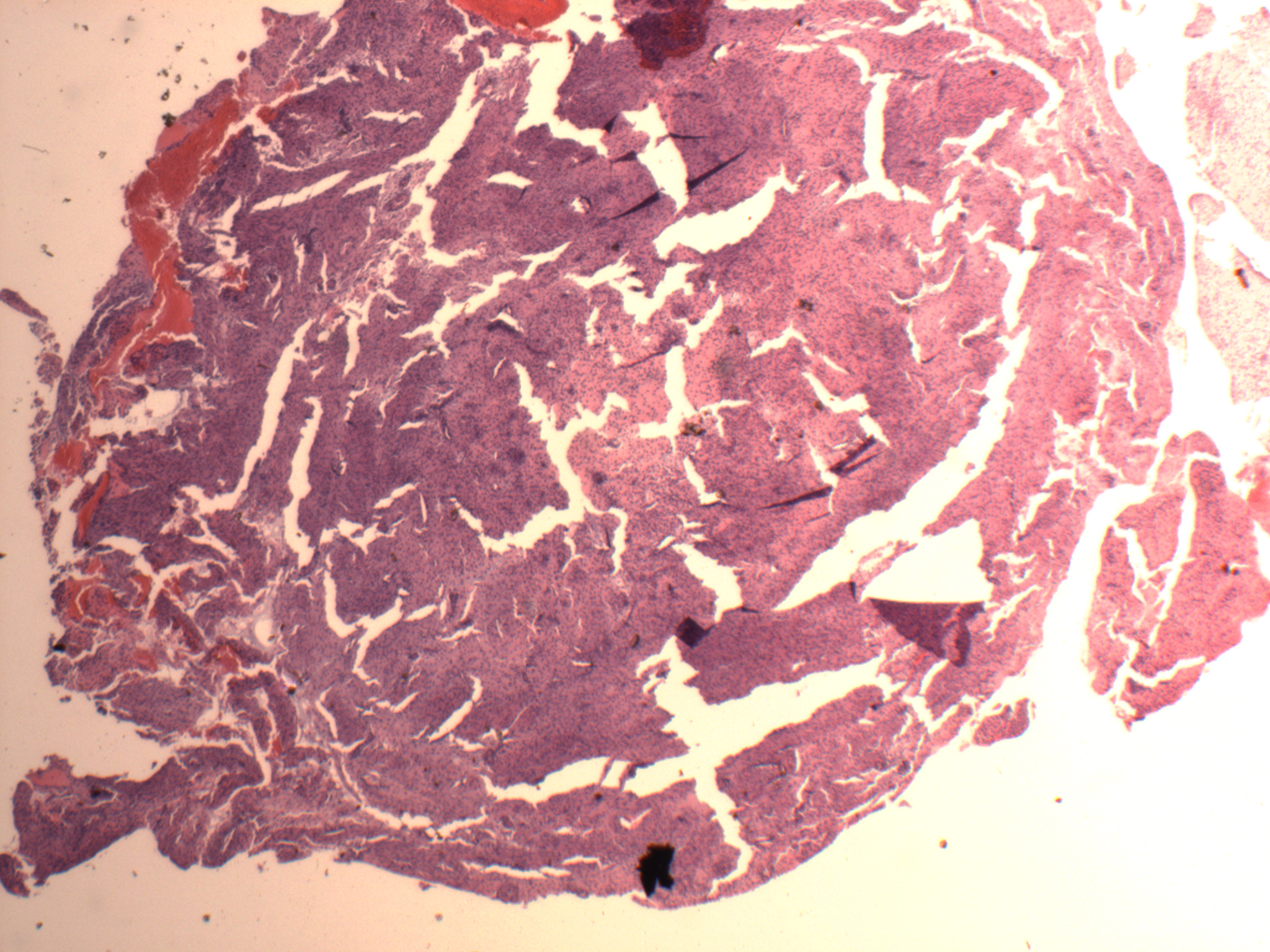
- Endometrial stromal nodule, histology
- Specialty: Gynecology, Pathology
- Symptoms: Usually asymptomatic, abnormal vaginal bleeding, pelvic mass
- Usual onset: Reproductive to postmenopausal age
- Duration: Chronic, benign
- Types: Benign endometrial stromal tumor
- Causes: Unknown; associated with hypoestrogenism, tamoxifen
- Risk factors: None specific
- Diagnostic method: Histopathology, immunohistochemistry (CD10+, desmin−)
- Differential diagnosis: Leiomyoma, Endometrial stromal sarcoma
- Treatment: Surgical excision (hysterectomy or conservative)
- Medication: None specific; hormonal therapy rarely used
- Prognosis: Excellent after complete excision
- Frequency: <10% of uterine mesenchymal neoplasms
- Deaths: None reported

An endometrial stromal nodule is a noninfiltrative, circumscribed proliferation of endometrial stromal cells and is a benign subtype of endometrial stromal tumor. The appearance of the cells is identical to normal endometrial stromal cells. This can only be differentiated from low-grade endometrial stromal sarcoma by confirming lack of infiltration. These nodules are rare and typically discovered incidentally after hysterectomy, with an excellent prognosis following complete excision.

== Clinical features ==
Patients are usually asymptomatic or present with abnormal vaginal bleeding or a pelvic mass. The tumor is most commonly diagnosed in perimenopausal or postmenopausal women (fifth to sixth decades), though cases have been reported across a wide age range (23–86 years). Endometrial stromal nodules are frequently discovered incidentally after hysterectomy performed for other indications. Rare associations with tamoxifen therapy, radiation exposure, or hypoestrogenic states have been described, though no definitive etiologic factors are established.

== Pathology ==
=== Gross description ===
Well-circumscribed, nonencapsulated, soft yellow-tan mass (1–12 cm) with expansile borders.

=== Microscopic description ===
Microscopically, the tumor consists of monotonous proliferations of bland endometrial stromal cells resembling proliferative-phase stroma. Characteristic findings include prominent proliferative-type arterioles, collagen bands, and an expansile (non-infiltrative) border. Invasion, if present, is limited to <3 mm and <3 tongue-like protrusions. Mitotic activity is typically low (<10/10 HPF), and angiolymphatic invasion is absent.

== Differential diagnosis ==
The differential includes cellular leiomyoma. Diagnosis may be aided by immunostaining; endometrial stromal nodules are positive for CD10; leiomyomas are positive for caldesmon and desmin (and sometimes CD10).

== Treatment and prognosis ==
Complete surgical excision (usually hysterectomy) is curative, and the prognosis is excellent with no risk of recurrence or metastasis when margins are clear. In select cases where fertility preservation is desired, conservative excision with close hysteroscopic follow-up may be considered, though this approach limits margin assessment.
