= Endometrial stromal tumour =

Tumor of the endometrium

Endometrial stromal tumours are a type of mesenchymal tumor of the main body of the uterus. Types include endometrial stromal nodule, the distinct low and high-grade endometrial stromal sarcomas, and undifferentiated uterine sarcoma.
