= Kelly M. McMasters =

American surgeon and researcher

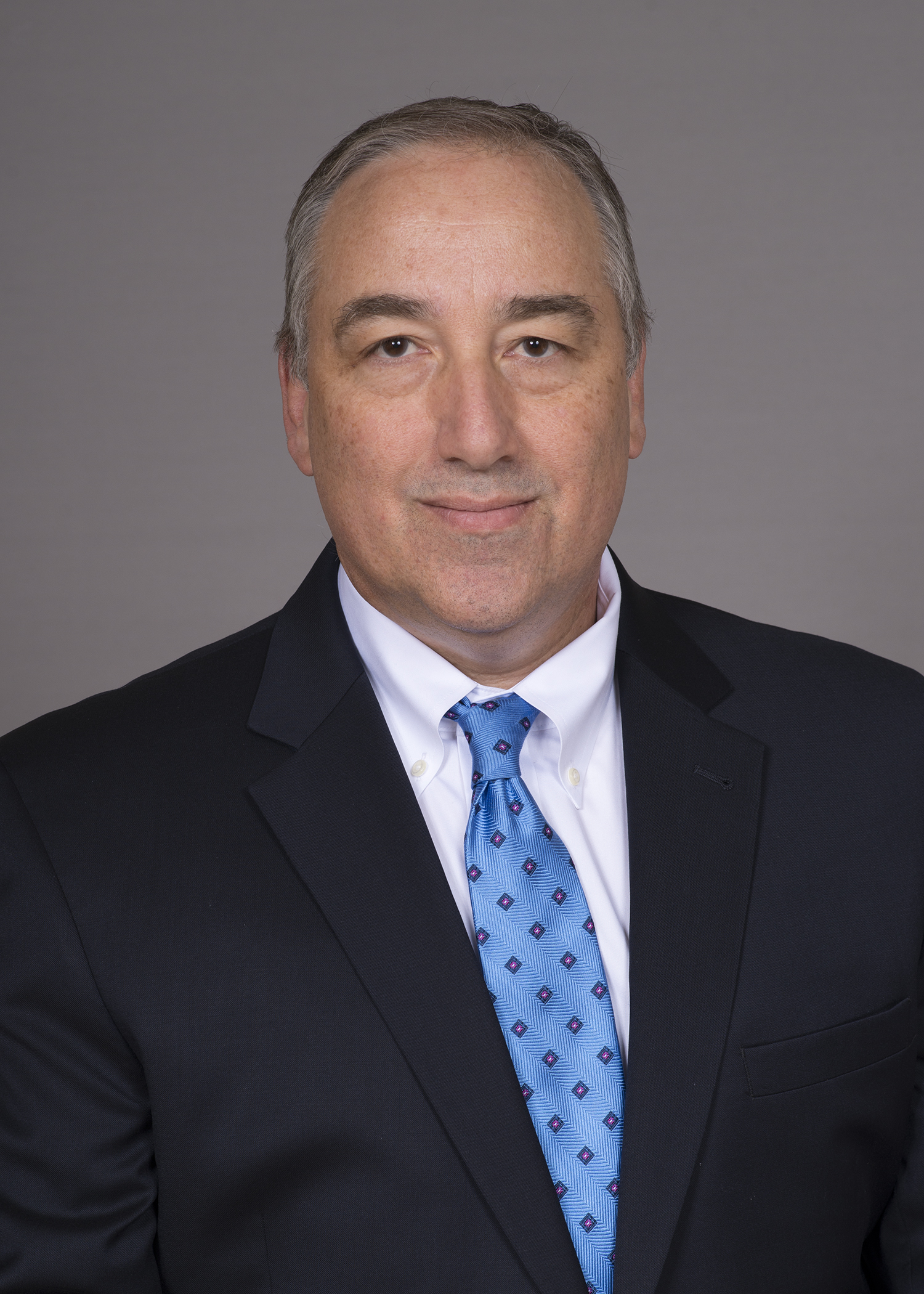
- Born: Camden, New Jersey, US

Academic background
- Education: B.A., Biology, 1983, Colgate University; Ph.D., Cell and Developmental Biology, 1988, Rutgers University; MD, 1989, Robert Wood Johnson Medical School
- Thesis: Regulation of gene expression in ovarian granulosa cells (1988)

Kelly M. McMasters is an American surgeon and researcher. He is the Ben A. Reid Sr., MD Professor and Chair of the Hiram C. Polk Jr., MD Department of Surgery at the University of Louisville School of Medicine.

== Early life and education ==
McMasters is a native of Camden, New Jersey, US. Following high school, he earned his undergraduate degree in biology from Colgate University and completed the MD/PhD program at Robert Wood Johnson Medical School and Rutgers University. He then completed a General Surgery residency at the University of Louisville School of Medicine (U of L) and Surgical Oncology Fellowship at MD Anderson Cancer Center.

== Career ==
Upon completing his residency and fellowship, McMasters joined the faculty at U of L as an assistant professor of Surgical Oncology in July 1996. He was shortly thereafter promoted to the Lolita and Sam Weakley Professor of Surgical Oncology where he focused on developing a new treatment for melanoma. His study on this subject enrolled over 830 melanoma patients and coordinated with nearly 80 centers around the United States. By 1999, he was recognized as one of Kentucky's young leaders for the 21st century. At the turn of the century, McMaster's National Sunbelt Melanoma Trial, which had enrolled 1,500 melanoma patients from 60 cancer centers nationwide, became the largest study of melanoma ever conducted. In 2005, McMasters was appointed Chairman of the Department of Surgery at the U of L School of Medicine. While serving in this role, McMasters was appointed to serve on the Scientific Advisory Board for Provectus Pharmaceuticals, Inc.

In October 2017, McMasters was appointed the editor-in-chief of the journal Annals of Surgical Oncology starting in March 2018. A few years later, he was also selected to serve on the executive board for the American Board of Surgery.

== Personal life ==
McMasters and his wife Beth have sons together.
