= Fibroepithelial neoplasm =

Fibroepithelial neoplasms
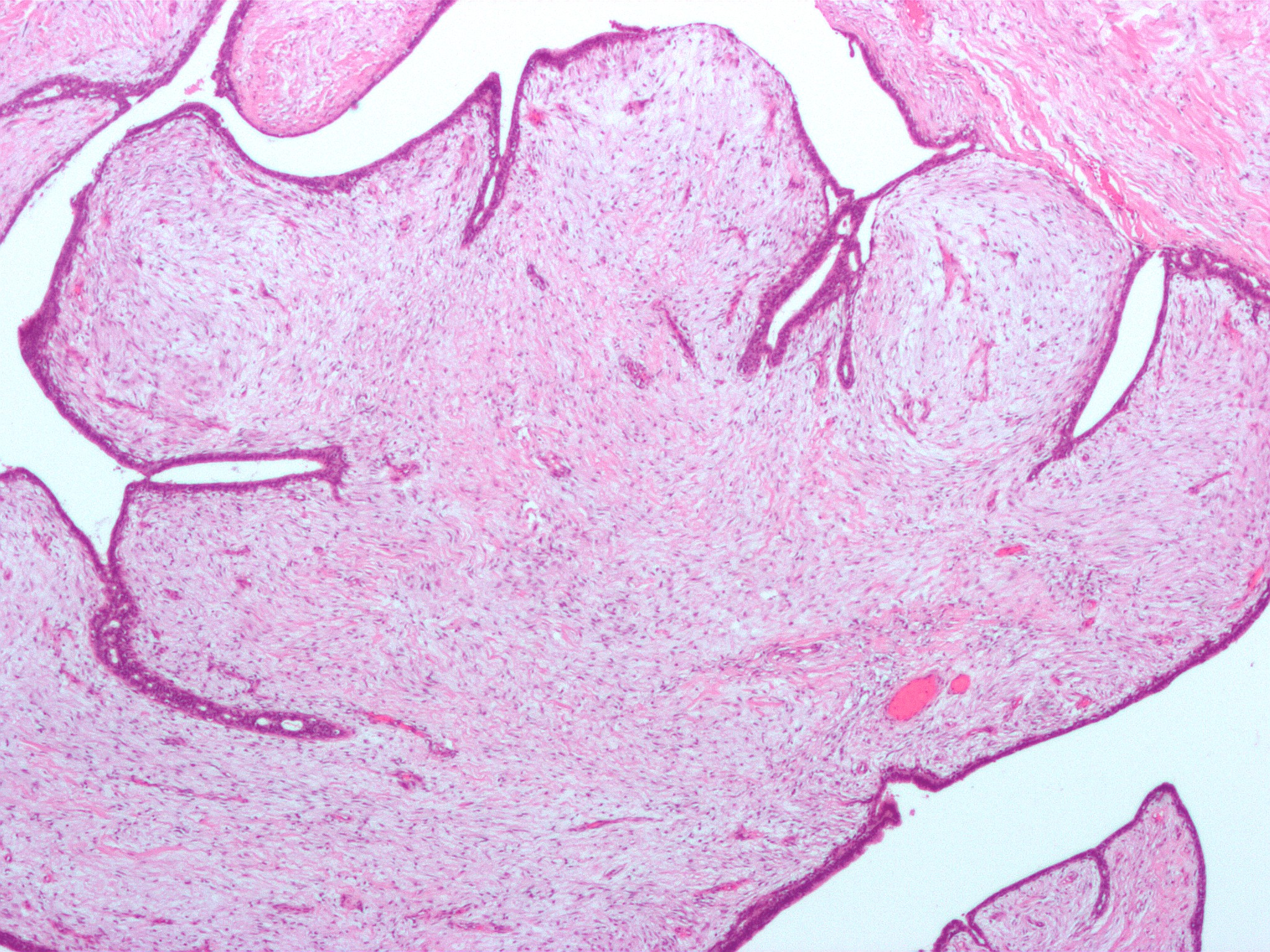
- Fibroepithelial neoplasm (Phyllodes tumor).
- Specialty: Oncology

A fibroepithelial neoplasm (or tumor) is a biphasic tumor. They consist of epithelial tissue, and stromal or mesenchymal tissue. They may be benign or malignant.

Examples include:

- Brenner tumor of the ovary
- Fibroadenoma of the breast
- Phyllodes tumor of the breast

Sometimes fibroepithelial polyps (FEPs) of the vulva may be misdiagnosed as cancers. However not much harm is caused because the treatment of both is excision. The consent for removal must however be completely informed.
