= Adenosarcoma =

Type of tumor

- Other names: Müllerian adenosarcoma
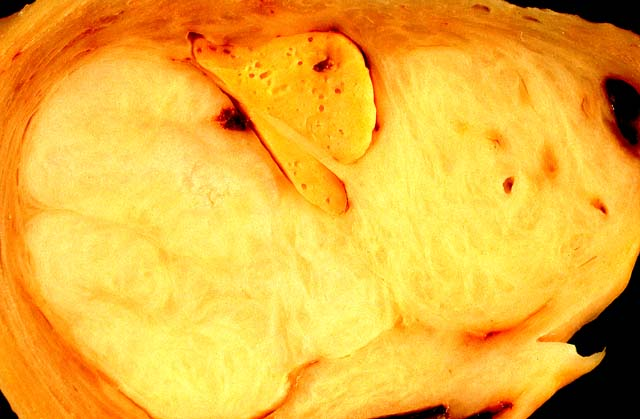
- Müllerian adenosarcoma in the hysterectomy specimen of a 44-year-old woman, who presented with menorrhagia and iron deficiency anemia.
- Specialty: Oncology

Adenosarcoma (also Müllerian adenosarcoma) is a rare malignant tumor that occurs in women of all age groups, but most commonly post-menopause. Adenosarcoma arises from mesenchymal tissue and has a mixture of the tumoral components of an adenoma, a tumor of epithelial origin, and a sarcoma, a tumor originating from connective tissue. The adenoma, or epithelial component of the tumor, is benign, while the sarcomatous stroma is malignant. The most common site of adenosarcoma formation is the uterus, but it can also occur in the cervix and ovaries. It more rarely arises in the vagina and fallopian tubes as well as primary pelvic or peritoneal sites, such as the omentum, especially in those with a history of endometriosis. The rare cases of adenosarcoma outside the female genital tract usually occur in the liver, bladder, kidney, as well as the intestine and are typically associated with endometriosis.

Müllerian adenosarcoma with sarcomatous overgrowth is a very aggressive form of adenosarcoma that is characterized by post-operative recurrence and metastases even when diagnosed at an early stage. Sarcomatous overgrowth is diagnosed when the sarcomatous portion of the adenosarcoma makes up more than 25% of the tumor. Adenosarcomas do not typically have distant metastases, but they have a propensity for local recurrence.

== Uterine Adenosarcoma ==
Uterine adenosarcoma are a subtype of uterine sarcomas. Uterine sarcomas account for 3 to 9% of uterine cancers, and 5.5 to 9% of uterine sarcomas are adenosarcomas. The most common presenting symptom is abnormal vaginal bleeding. Other symptoms include pelvic pain, abdominal mass, or vaginal discharge. Uterine adenosarcoma commonly arise from the endometrium.

Uterine adenosarcomas have the highest incidence in perimenopausal and postmenopausal women with a mean age of 50 years, but some incidence among children. Survival is better compared to other types of uterine sarcomas. The prognosis of uterine adenosarcoma depends on the stage and if sarcomatous overgrowth is present.

=== Risk factors ===
No definitive causes of adenosarcoma have been identified. Potential risk factors include a medical history of endometriosis and use of estrogen modulating agents such as tamoxifen. Other potential risk factors include previous pelvic irradiation and prolonged estrogen exposure

=== Treatment ===
The standard care of treatment is total abdominal hysterectomy with bilateral salpingo-oophorectomy. Lymphadenectomy is usually not performed as the incidence of lymph node metastasis is rare. There is no standardized chemotherapy, hormone therapy, or radiation therapy. Because of the rarity of adenosarcoma, there is limited data to guide treatment decisions, particularly in regard to recurrent or metastatic tumors. Chemotherapy may be considered in patients with recurrence or tumors unable to be completely removed through surgery. It has been suggested that uterine adenosarcomas can respond to doxorubicin/ifosfamide and gemcitabine/docetaxel chemotherapy. The use of hormone therapy in recurrent or metastatic disease is limited to case reports.

=== Recurrence and Survival ===
Survival is influenced by the presence of myometrial invasion, sarcomatous overgrowth, lymphovascular invasion, necrosis, and the presence of heterologous elements, which are features in the tumor not native to the tissue of origin such as rhabdomyoblastic differentiation Post-operative recurrence is common in uterine adenosarcomas. Recurrence usually occurs in the vagina, pelvis, and abdomen, and is seen in up to 30% of cases resulting in a poor prognosis.

The presence and depth of the sarcoma's myometrial invasion determines early staging diagnosis. The FIGO (International Federation of Gynecology and Obstetrics) staging is IA: no myometrial invasion, IB: inner myometrial half, IC: outer myometrial half. If confined to the endometrium with no myometrial invasion (IA), the prognosis is good with 7-13% recurrence for noninvasive tumors. FIGO stage II or greater is considered advanced with overall survival of approximately 60% with myometrial invasion, but less than 50% if metastases are present. High grade adenosarcomas tend to have extrauterine spread and rapid recurrence. Adenosarcoma with myometrial invasion recurred in 36-46% of cases. Patients with sarcomatous overgrowth showed significantly increased risk of recurrence, around 70-77 %, a risk of metastases around 40%, and a decreased 5-year overall survival, 50 to 60%. This is comparable to other high grade uterine sarcomas.

== Ovarian Adenosarcoma ==
Ovarian adenosarcoma is a very rare tumor effecting the ovaries. 97.5% of ovarian adenosarcomas are unilateral, affecting only one ovary. It mainly affects women aged 30–84, with a mean age of 54. Symptoms of ovarian adenosarcoma include abdominal or pelvic pain and abdominal swelling. Tumor may present as adnexal mass.

=== Risk factors ===
Most of the cases reported have associated endometriosis or an adenosarcoma arising from an endometriotic area, but the direct relation between this tumor and endometriosis has not been made clear in the literature.

=== Treatment ===
Typically, ovarian adenosarcomas are surgically removed via salphingopherectomy or panhysterectomy. 67% of patients had tumor rupture at or before excision. There is no standardized chemotherapy, hormone therapy, or radiation therapy due to limited data.

=== Recurrence and Survival ===
Ovarian adenosarcomas have a worse prognosis than uterine adenosarcomas, presumably because of the greater ease of peritoneal spread. Many of these ovarian tumors have caused problems in differential diagnosis. Advanced stage ovarian adenosarcoma is characterized by extraovarian spreading, sarcomatous overgrowth, and tumor rupture. The presence of sarcomatous overgrowth is associated with increased risk of recurrence or extraovarian spreading. Recurrence poses more of a threat than metastases, which appear to be less prevalent. 5 year survival is 64%, 10 year survival is 46%.

== Cervical Adenosarcoma ==
Cervical adenosarcoma is an extremely rare tumor that occurs most often in women of reproductive age. Typically, adenosarcoma found in the cervix is a result of extrauterine spreading of the tumor, though adenosarcoma can arise in the cervix. Symptoms of cervical adenosarcoma, like uterine adenosarcoma, are characterized by abnormal bleeding. Treatment mainly consists of total abdominal hysterectomy, occasionally with additional radiotherapy and chemotherapy. Prognosis of cervical adenosarcoma is usually favorable, with metastasis and recurrence of the tumor being less common. As with uterine adenosarcoma, the depth of myometrial invasion determines the prognosis, with deeper invasion being associated with metastases and tumor recurrence.

== See also ==
- Sarcoma
