= Mixed tumor =

Tumor derived from multiple tissue types

A mixed tumor is a tumor that derives from multiple tissue types. A biplastic tumor or biphasic tumor has two tissue types.

== True versus false ==
- A true mixed tumor contains multiple types of neoplastic cells. Some sources require the included tissue types to be neoplastic for the definition of mixed tumor.
- A "false" mixed tumor contains one type of neoplastic cells, but which have more than one appearance. For example, benign pleomorphic salivary gland tumors may have some tumors cells that form pseudocartilage. Yet, all the tumor cells have similar myoepithelial profile on immunohistochemistry, and are thus classified as one cell type.

Reactive or adaptive changes to a tumor does not count towards a classification as mixed. Such changes include angiogenesis (blood vessel proliferation) and/or desmoplasia (proliferation of connective tissue).

== Number of cell types ==
- A biplastic tumor or biphasic tumor consists of two tissue types.
- A teratoma is the main tumor type that often includes more than two tissue types. They may form for example hair, muscle, teeth, and/or bone.

== Examples of true mixed tumors ==
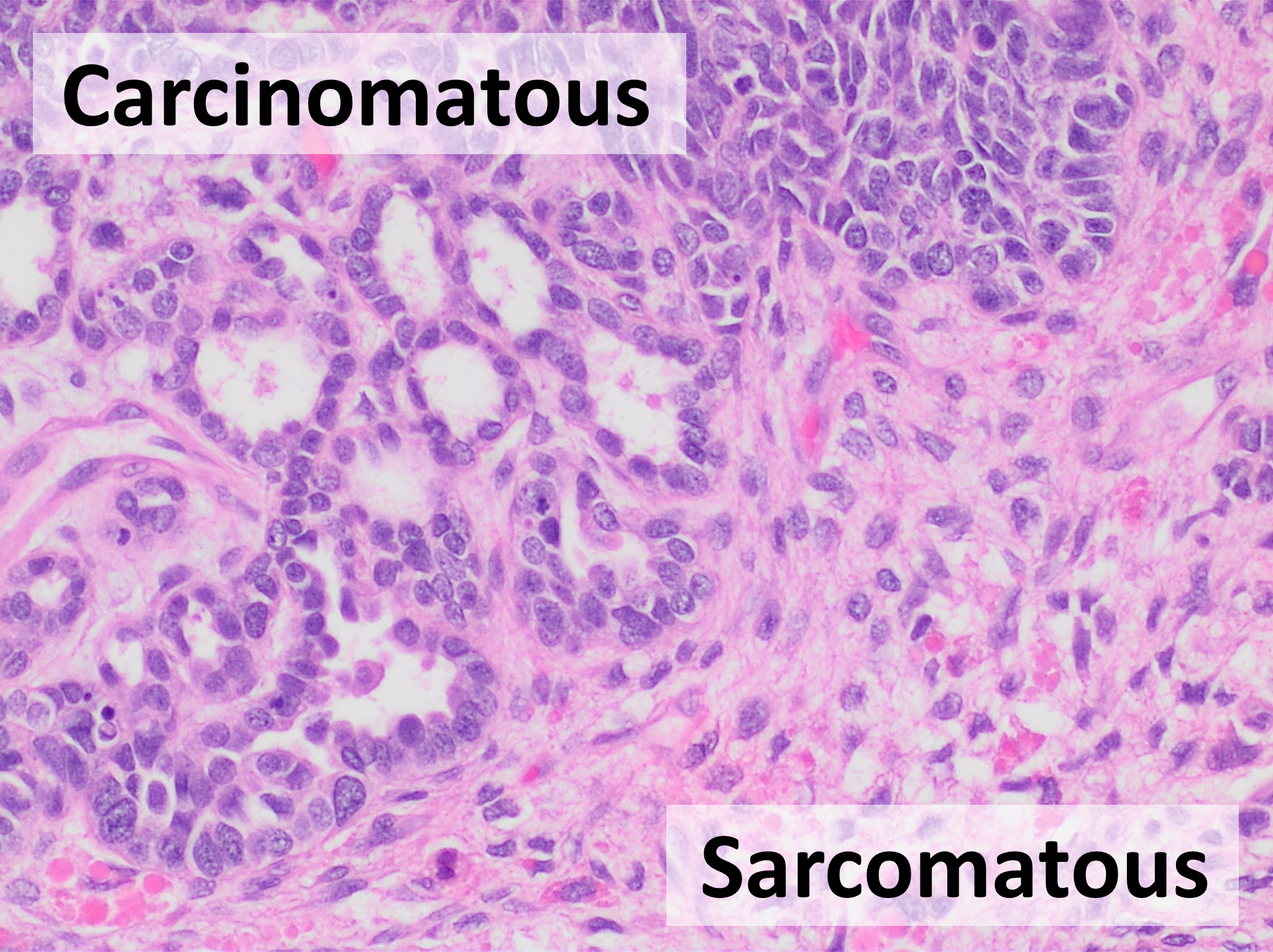
Micrograph of a carcinosarcoma of the ovary. H&E stain, showing: carcinomatous element at top left, such as having gland formations; sarcomatous element at bottom right, such as having more spindle-shaped nuclei and abundant extracellular matrix.

| Disease | Cellular elements | |
|---|---|---|
| Fibroadenoma | Epithelium | Stroma |
| Ceruminous adenoma | Inner luminal secretory cells | Myoepithelial cells |
| Carcinosarcoma | Carcinomatous cells | Sarcomatous cells |
