= Mixed Müllerian tumor =

- Other names: Malignant mixed mesodermal tumor (MMMT)
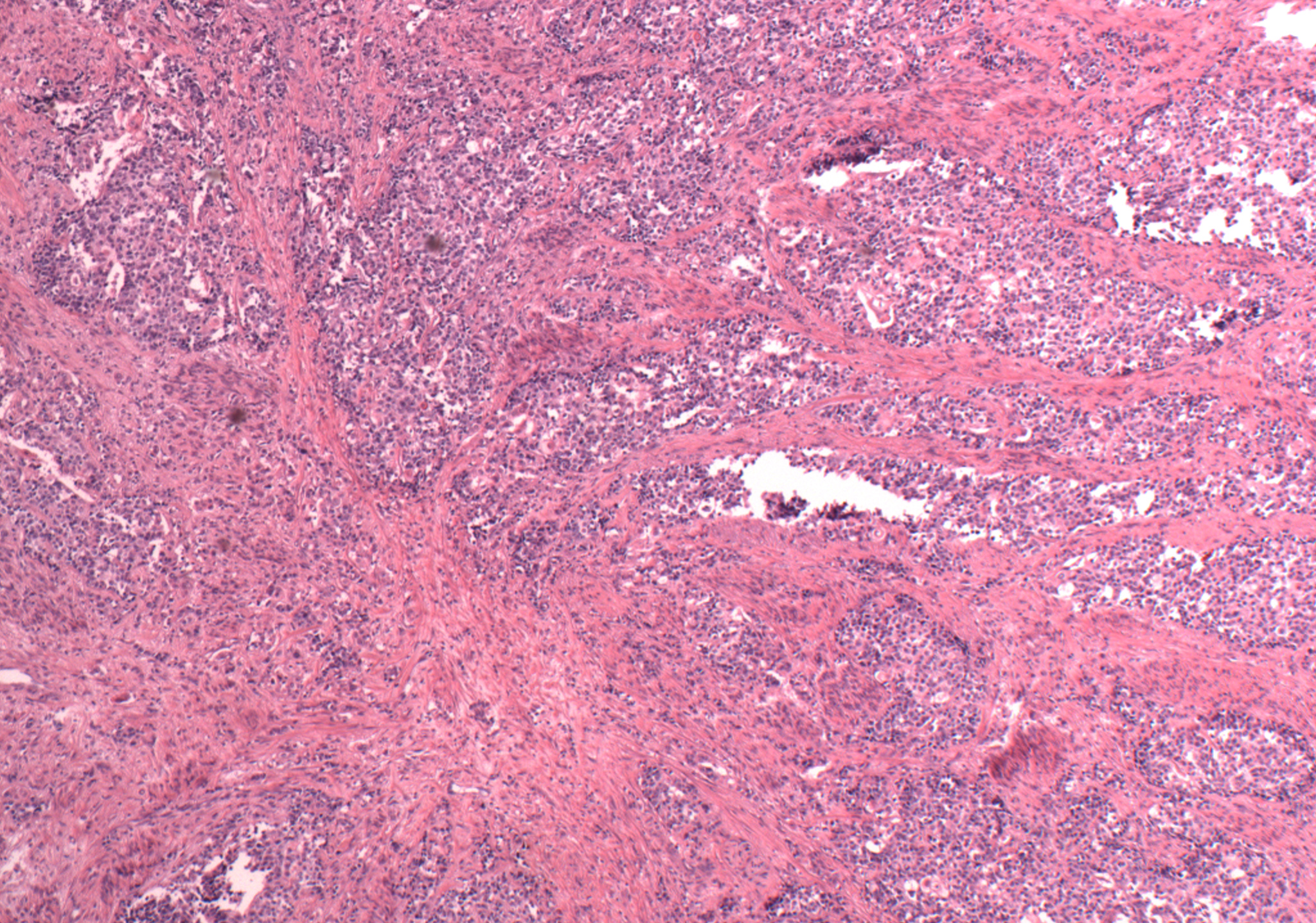
- Specialty: Oncology, gynecology

A malignant mixed Müllerian tumor, also known as malignant mixed mesodermal tumor (MMMT) is a cancer found in the uterus, the ovaries, the fallopian tubes and other parts of the body that contains both carcinomatous (epithelial tissue) and sarcomatous (connective tissue) components. It is divided into two types, homologous (in which the sarcomatous component is made of tissues found in the uterus such as endometrial, fibrous and/or smooth muscle tissues) and a heterologous type (made up of tissues not found in the uterus, such as cartilage, skeletal muscle and/or bone). MMMT account for between two and five percent of all tumors derived from the body of the uterus, and are found predominantly in postmenopausal women with an average age of 66 years. Risk factors are similar to those of adenocarcinomas and include obesity, exogenous estrogen therapies, and nulliparity. Less well-understood but potential risk factors include tamoxifen therapy and pelvic irradiation.

== Classification ==
There is debate over the naming of MMMT; the term carcinosarcoma was formerly used to describe lesions with homologous tumors, and "malignant mixed Müllerian tumor" or "mixed mesodermal tumor" was used to describe heterologous tumors. While "carcinosarcoma" now considered standard, "malignant mixed Müllerian tumor" has a lengthy history within gynecological literature and is expected to continue to be used. The naming issue to a certain extent reflects histological characteristics and development of the tumors, in which the different types of tissues are believed to either develop separately and join into a single mass (the "collision" theory), that an adenocarcinoma stimulates the stroma to create a tumor (the "composition" theory), or that the tumor is the result of a stem cell that differentiates into different cell types (the "combination" theory). "Collision" tumors are normally easily recognized and not considered true MMMTs; the "combination" theory is most widely held, and is due to evidence that the tumors develop from a single line of cells, developing in a fashion similar to the fundus of the uterus from the Müllerian duct – first from a stem cell into a population of cells, that then differentiates into epithelial and stromal components.

There is evidence that some tumors are better explained by the composition theory, due to the aggressive nature of the epithelial cells involved which tend to metastasize much more readily than the sarcomal component. The behavior of MMMT overall is more related to the type and grade of the epithelium than the sarcoma, which suggests the sarcomal portion is an atypical "bystander" than primary driver of the tumor. Despite this, when purely endometrial tumors are compared to MMMTs, the MMMT tumor tends to have a worse prognosis.

== Morphology ==
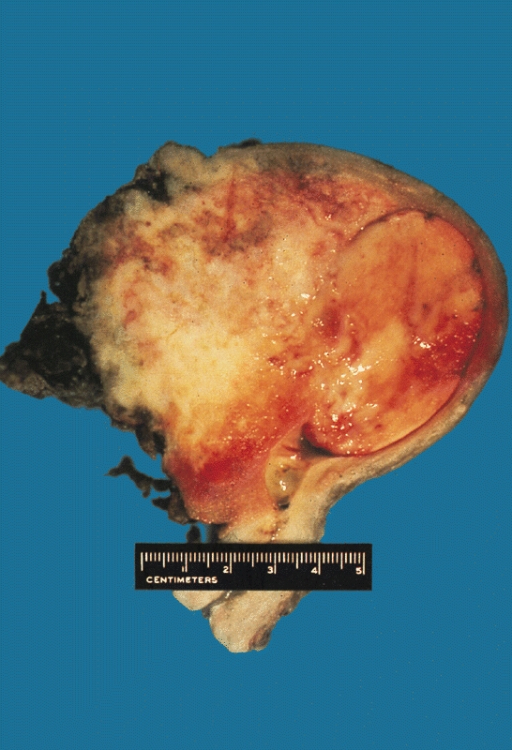
Carcinosarcoma of the uterus

In gross appearance, MMMTs are fleshier than adenocarcinomas, may be bulky and polypoid, and sometimes protrude through the cervical os. On histology, the tumors consist of adenocarcinoma (endometrioid, serous or clear cell) mixed with the malignant mesenchymal (sarcoma) elements; alternatively, the tumor may contain two distinct and separate epithelial and mesenchymal components. Sarcomatous components may also mimic extrauterine tissues (e.g., striated muscle, cartilage, adipose tissue, and bone). Metastases usually contain only epithelial components.

== Prognosis ==
Outcome of MMMTs is determined primarily by depth of invasion and stage. As with endometrial carcinomas, the prognosis is influenced by the grade and type of the adenocarcinoma, being poorest with serous differentiation. MMMTs are highly malignant; a stage I tumor has an expected five-year survival rate of 50%, while the overall five-year survival rate is less than 20%.

Staging of uterine MMMTs is as follows:

- Stage I. Carcinoma is confined to the corpus uteri itself.
- Stage II. Carcinoma involves the corpus and the cervix.
- Stage III. Carcinoma extends outside the uterus but not outside the lesser pelvis.
- Stage IV. Carcinoma extends outside the true pelvis or involves the mucosa of the bladder or the rectum.

A Cochrane review indicates women with high stage uterine carcinosarcoma (stage 3 or 4) who were treated with combination chemotherapy including Ifosfamide, were at lower risk of disease progression and death than those women treated with Ifosfamide alone. However, more women experienced side effects with combination therapy than with ifosamide alone. Radiotherapy to the abdomen was not associated with improved survival.
