= Endometrial stromal sarcoma =

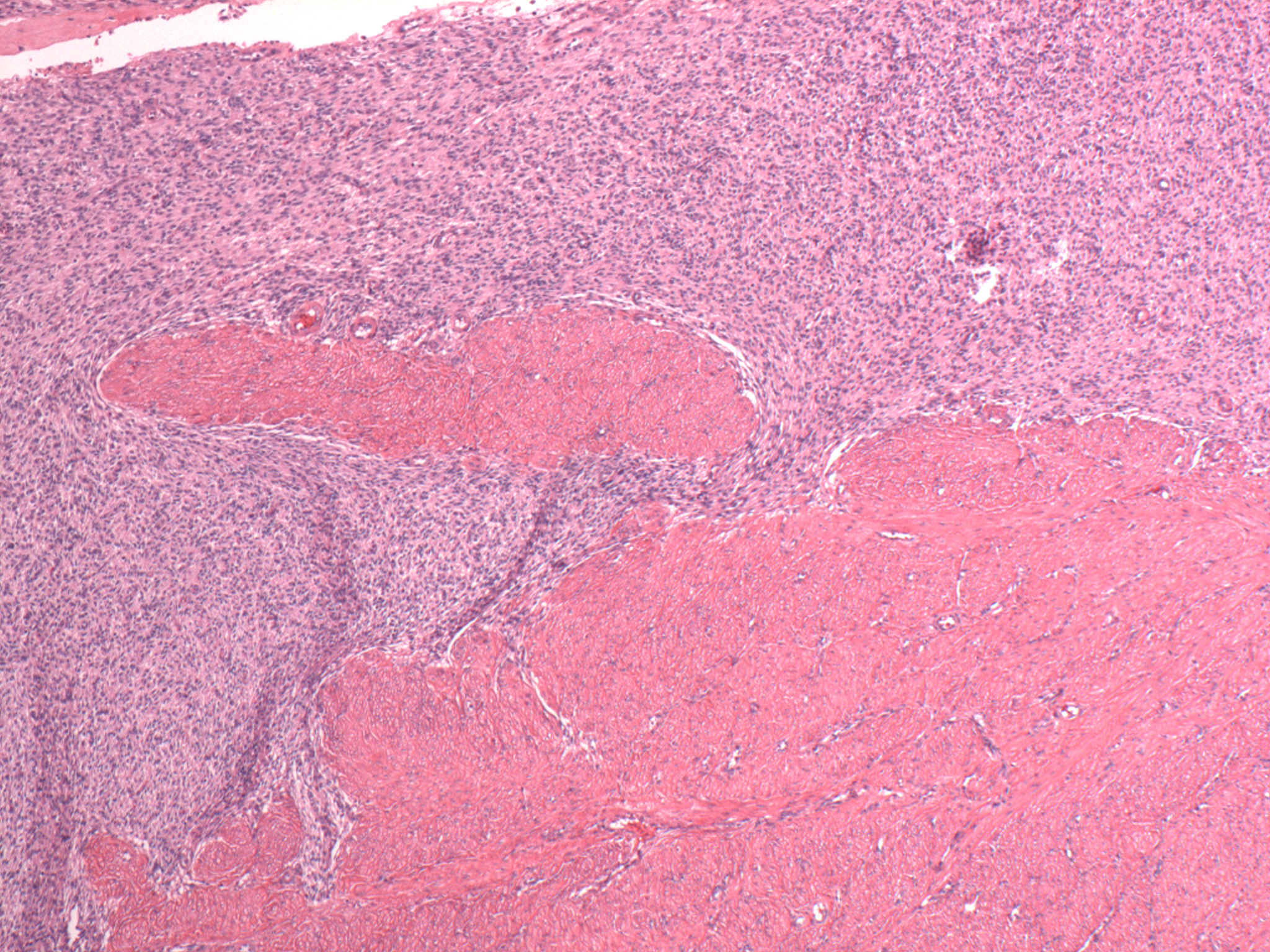
- Micrograph of a low-grade endometrial stromal sarcoma. H&E stain.
- Specialty: Oncology, gynecology
- Risk factors: Hysterectomy,Death,infection
- Treatment: Hysterectomy, Steroids
- Medication: Chemotherapy,Hormones

Endometrial stromal sarcoma is a malignant subtype of endometrial stromal tumor arising from the stroma (connective tissue) of the endometrium rather than the glands. There are three grades for endometrial stromal tumors, as follows. It was previously known as endolymphatic stromal myosis because of diffuse infiltration of myometrial tissue or the invasion of lymphatic channels.

== Low-grade endometrial stromal sarcoma ==
Low-grade endometrial stromal sarcoma consists of cells resembling normal proliferative phase endometrium, but with infiltration or vascular invasion. These behave less aggressively, sometimes metastasizing, with cancer stage being the best predictor of survival. The cells express estrogen/progesterone-receptors.

== Undifferentiated uterine sarcoma ==
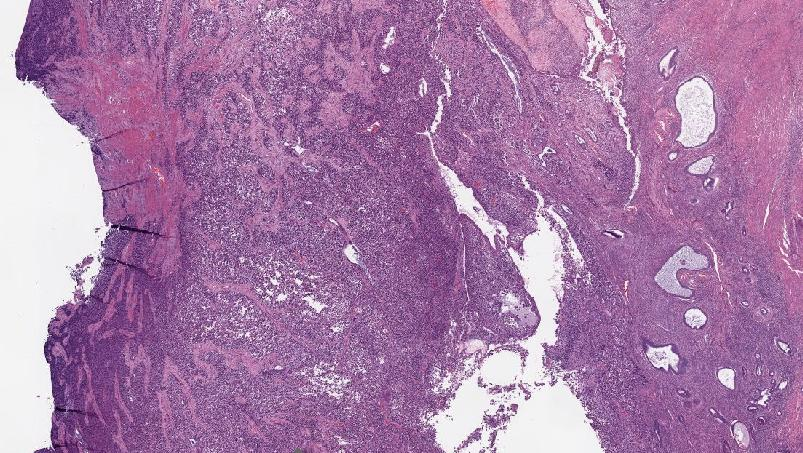
Endometrial Stromal Sarcoma, High-Grade

Undifferentiated uterine sarcoma, or undifferentiated (high-grade) endometrial stromal sarcoma, does not resemble normal endometrial stroma and behaves much more aggressively, frequently metastasizing. The differential includes leukemia, lymphoma, high-grade carcinoma, carcinosarcoma, and differentiated pure sarcomas.

== Pathology ==
=== Macroscopy ===
- Polypoid mass extending into broad ligament, ovaries and fallopian tubes.
- Lymphatic tumor plugs as yellow, ropy or ball-like masses.

=== Microscopy ===
- Monotonous ovoid cells to spindly cells with minimal cytoplasm.
- Prominent arterioles. Angiolymphatic invasion common.
- Up to 10-15 mitotic figures per 10 HPF in most active areas.
- Tongue-like infiltration between muscle bundles of myometrium.
- May exhibit myxoid, epithelioid and fibrous change.
- May have foam cells or hyalinization in the stroma.

=== Immunochemistry ===
- CD10+
- muscle markers (muscle specific actin MSA, smooth muscle actin SMA and desmin) positive in areas of smooth muscle differentiation
- CD117- (c-kit -)
- h-caldesmon-

== Genetic features ==
A recurrent chromosomal translocation, t(7;17)(p15;q21), occurs in endometrial stromal sarcoma. This translocation leads to the fusion of two polycomb group genes, JAZF1 and JJAZ1, with production of a fusion transcript with anti-apoptotic properties. Even normal endometrial stroma cells express the fusion gene, derived not by translocation, but by the "stitching" together of m-RNAs. Thus, it appears that a pro-survival gene in the normal endometrium is somehow subverted to become pro-neoplastic.
