= Uterine adenosarcoma =

- Other names: Adenosarcoma of the uterus, Müllerian adenosarcoma of the uterus
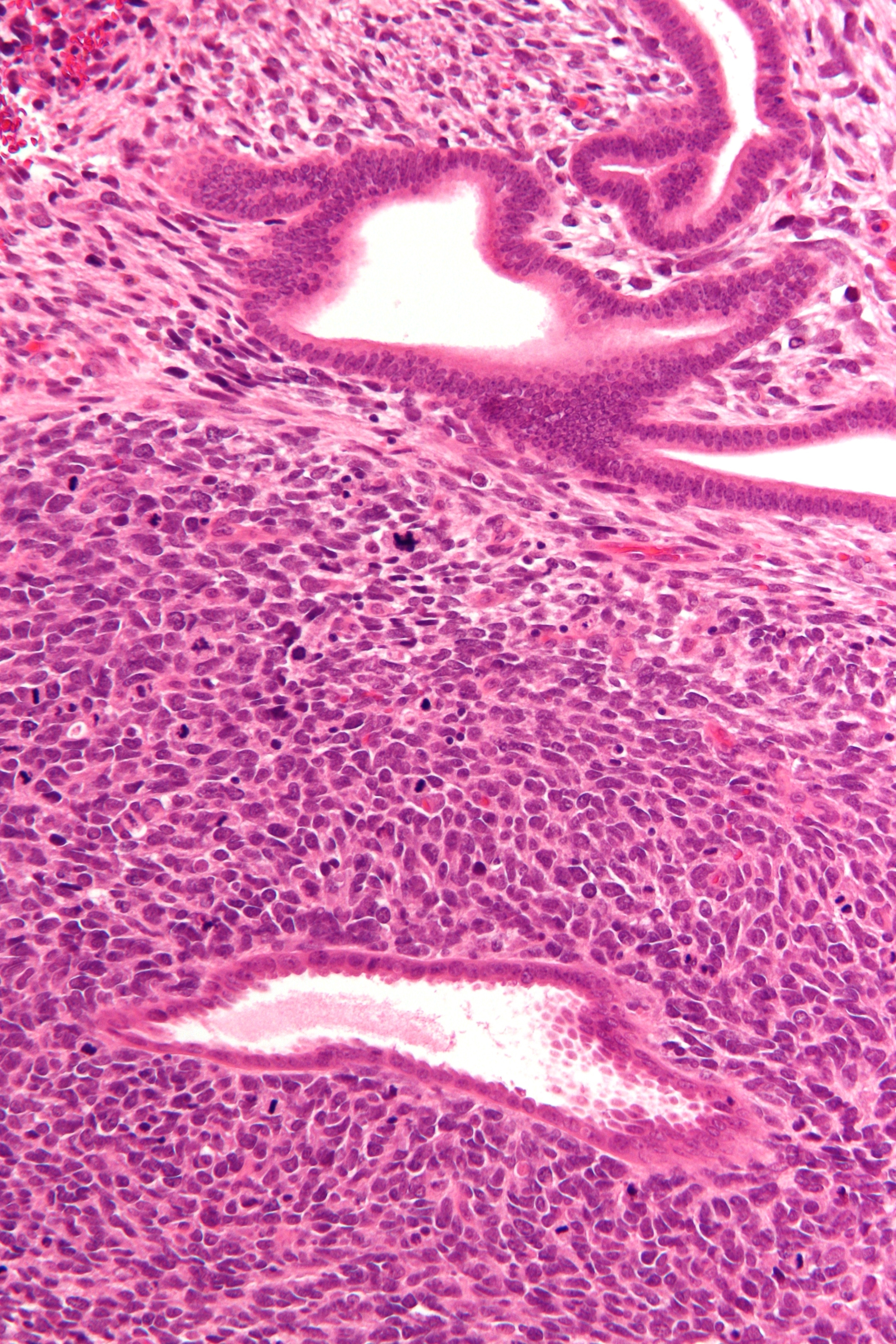
- Micrograph of a uterine adenosarcoma showing a mitotically active malignant stroma and benign glands. H&E stain.
- Specialty: Gynecology

Uterine adenosarcoma is an uncommon form of cancer that arises from mesenchymal tissue of the uterus and has a benign glandular component.

== Signs and symptoms ==
The most common presentation is vaginal bleeding. Other presentations include pelvic mass and uterine polyp. Generally, the clinical findings are non-specific.

== Pathology ==
Uterine adenosarcoma have, by definition, a malignant stroma and benign glandular elements. The World Health Organization (WHO) criteria have a mitotic rate cut point; however, this is often disregarded, as bland-appearing tumours with a low mitotic rate are known to metastasize occasionally.

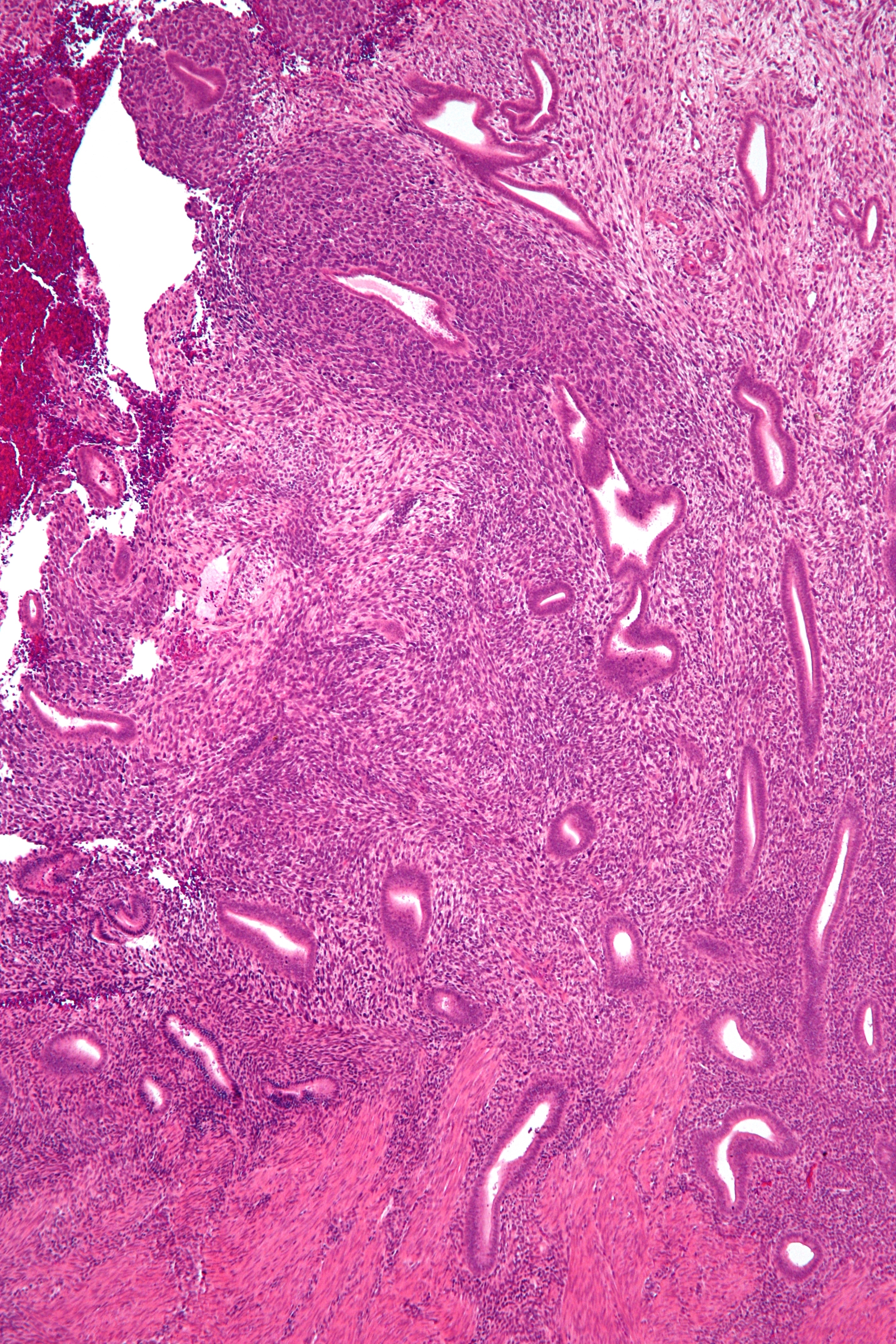
Low mag.

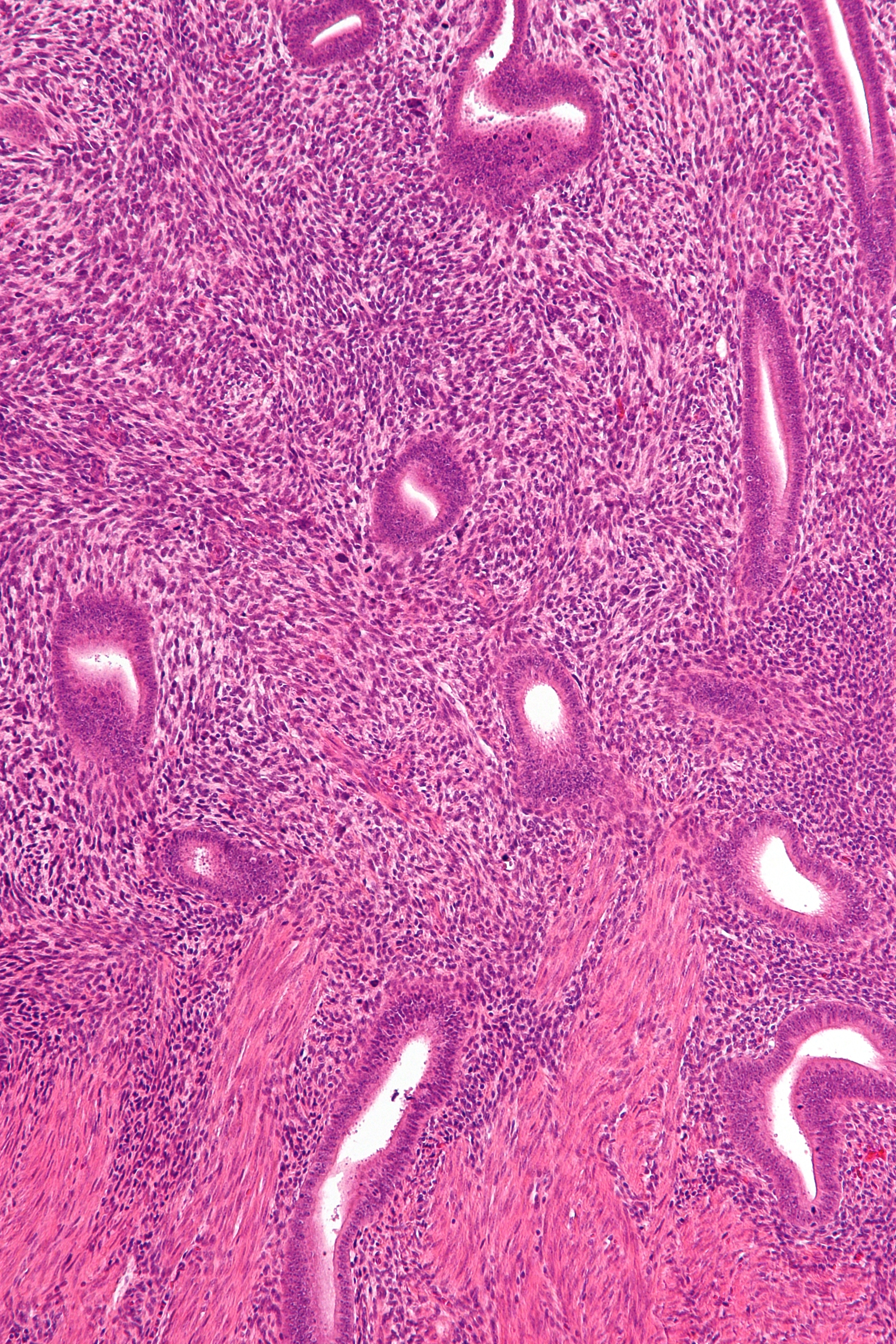
Intermed. mag.

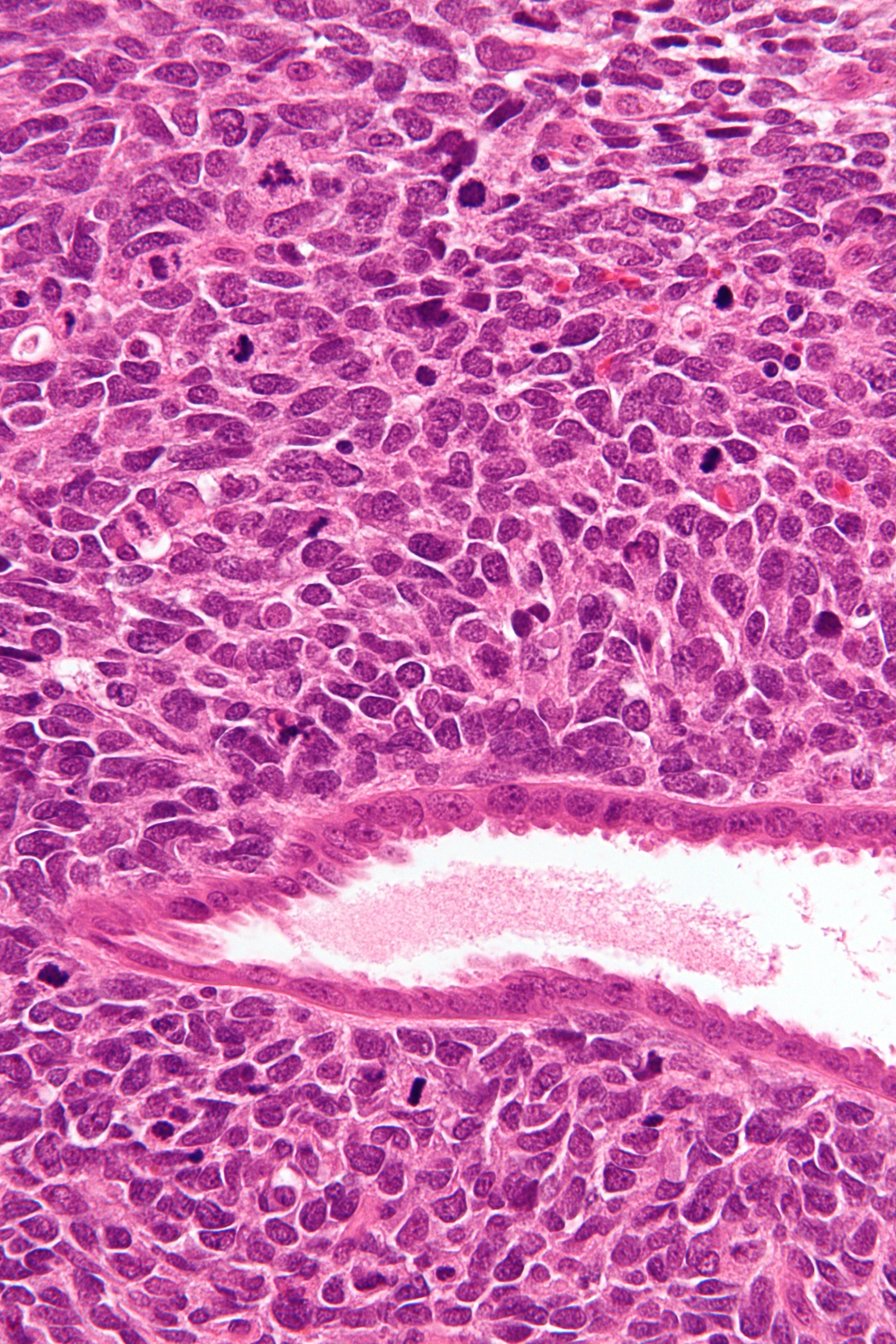
Very high mag.

== Treatment ==
Uterine adenosarcomas are typically treated with a total abdominal hysterectomy and bilateral salpingoophorectomy (TAH-BSO). Ovary-sparing surgery may be done in women wishing to preserve fertility.

== Prognosis ==
The prognosis is determined primarily by the cancer stage. Most tumours are discovered at an early stage and have a good prognosis, especially when compared to uterine carcinosarcoma. Five-year survival for stage I and stage III tumours is approximately 80% and 50% respectively.

== See also ==
- Carcinosarcoma
- Sarcoma
