= American Society of Breast Surgeons =

American Medical society

The American Society of Breast Surgeons is a professional medical society whose active members are general surgeons who dedicate all or part of their practices to the treatment of breast disease.

== Demographics ==
As of 2011, the Society has approximately 3000 members from throughout the U.S. and 35 countries around the world. The majority of its members devote 50% or more of their practice to breast surgery. They practice in a variety of settings ranging from urban to rural and from academic institutions to private practice.

== History ==
The Society was founded in 1995 by a group of general surgeons interested in providing a forum for discussion, education and advancement of the quality of care provided to patients with breast disease.

== Programs and services ==
The Society hosts educational programs that serve the professional needs and interests of its membership, most notably an annual meeting that provides the surgical community with a forum for the presentation and discussion of the latest research and developments. The Society also certifies individual surgeons and accredits facilities in breast ultrasound and in stereotactic breast procedures. In addition, its Mastery of Breast Surgery Program, a voluntary quality improvement initiative, is designed to help surgeons document their clinical performance of breast procedures, as well as their care of breast cancer patients and patients at risk for breast cancer. Participation in the program is recognized by the American Board of Surgery as fulfilling the requirements for Maintenance of Certification (MOC) Part 4 and is also recognized as a qualified 2010 Centers for Medicare and Medicaid Services (CMS)Physician Quality Reporting Initiative (PQRI) Registry for the Perioperative Measures Group. In 2015, the Society launched the breast360.org patient website that provides reliable information on breast disease and breast health. The articles are authored by Society member physicians.

== Collaboration ==
The Society collaborates with other organizations on education, advocacy and regulatory initiatives and members serve as representatives to numerous medical and quality improvement organizations.

== Membership criteria ==
The American Society of Breast Surgeons has four categories of membership: Active members including D.O. surgeons board certified by the American Osteopathic Board of Surgery or M.D. surgeons board certified by the American Board of Surgery, Associate members, Affiliate members, and Candidate members. Membership is open to surgeons, non-surgeon physicians involved in the care of patients with breast disease, and non-physician licensed healthcare professionals. In addition to those practicing in the United States, membership in all categories is open to international applicants who meet the requirements.
