= Adnexal mass =

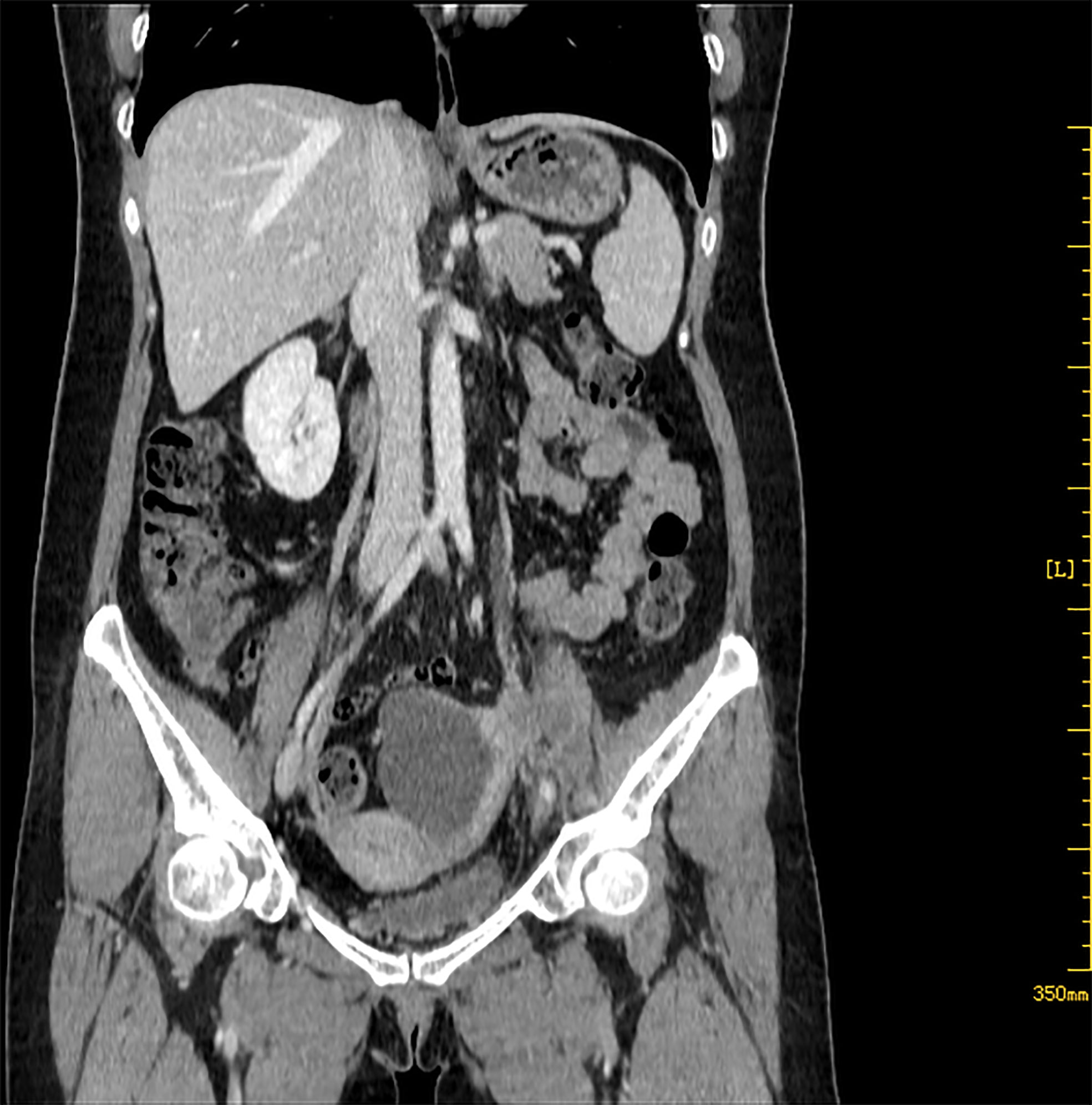
- Abdominal CT shows a 7.1 × 4.3 × 5.4 cm septal cystic, solid mass was detected on the left adnexal, and the solid components were enhanced.
- Specialty: Gynaecology
- Symptoms: Pain of the pelvic / illiac regions especially if it involves the ovaries or fallopian tubes
- Types: Benign or malignant; simple or complex

An adnexal mass is a lump in the tissue of the adnexa of the uterus (structures which are closely related structurally and functionally to the uterus, such as the ovaries, fallopian tubes, or any of the surrounding connective tissue). Adnexal masses can be benign (noncancerous) or malignant (cancerous), and they can be categorized as simple or complex.

== Causes ==
In premenopausal women, adnexal masses include ovarian cysts, ectopic (tubal) pregnancies, benign or malignant tumors, endometriomas, polycystic ovaries, and tubo-ovarian abscess. The most common causes for adnexal masses in premenopausal women include follicular cysts and corpus luteum cysts. Abscesses can form as a complication of pelvic inflammatory disease.

In postmenopausal women, adnexal masses may be caused by cancer, fibroids, fibromas, or diverticular abscesses.

== Diagnosis ==
One of the most important factors used to determine the clinical suspicion of malignancy of an adnexal mass is the sonographic (ultrasound) appearance of the mass. Indications that the mass is at a higher risk of being malignant include the presence of loculations, nodules, papillary structures, septations, or a size greater than 10 cm.

== Treatment ==
Removal of an adnexal mass is sometimes referred to as "adnexectomy".
