= Ovarian fibroma =

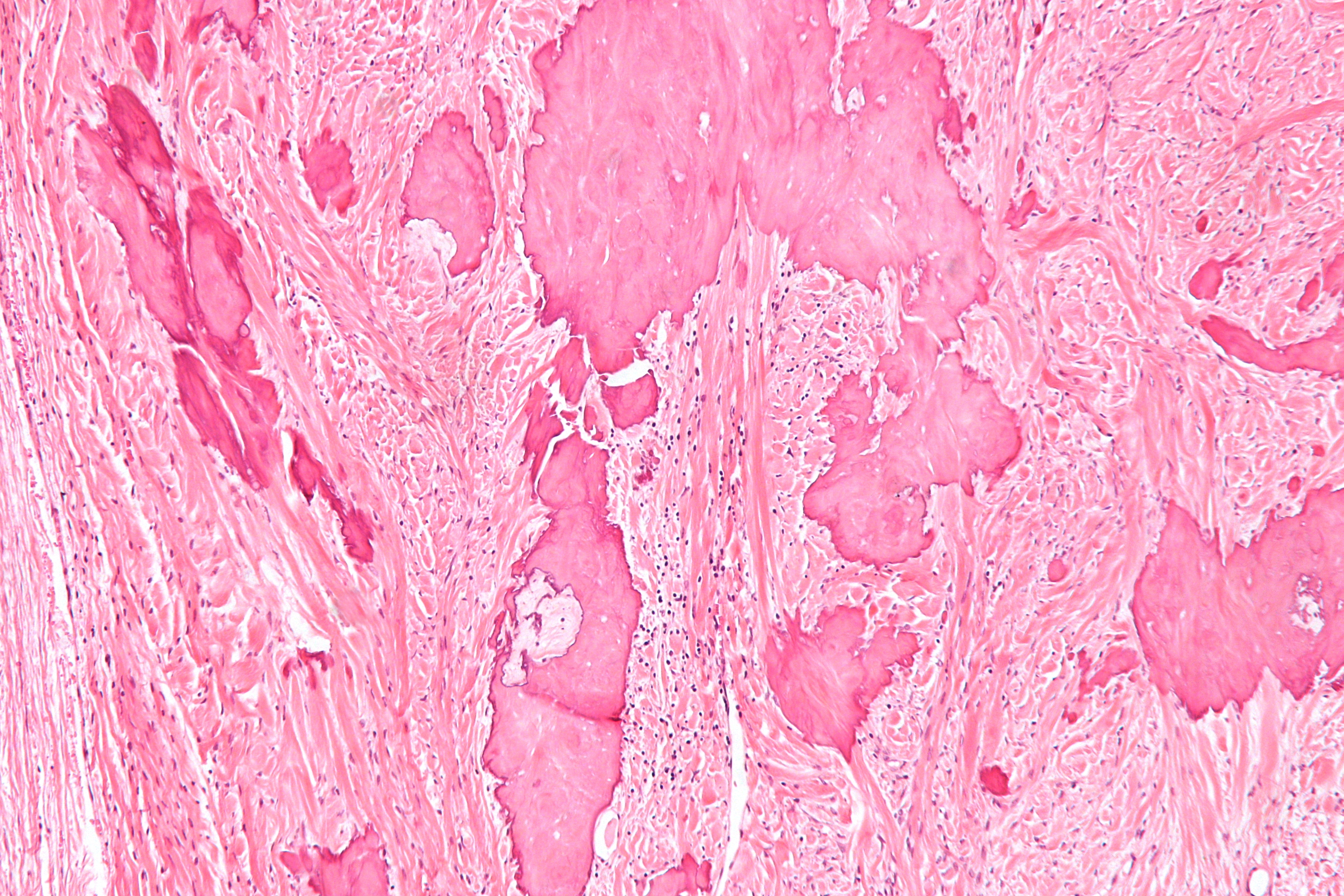
- Low magnification micrograph of a calcified ovarian fibroma in the context of nevoid basal cell carcinoma syndrome. H&E stain.
- Specialty: Gynecology

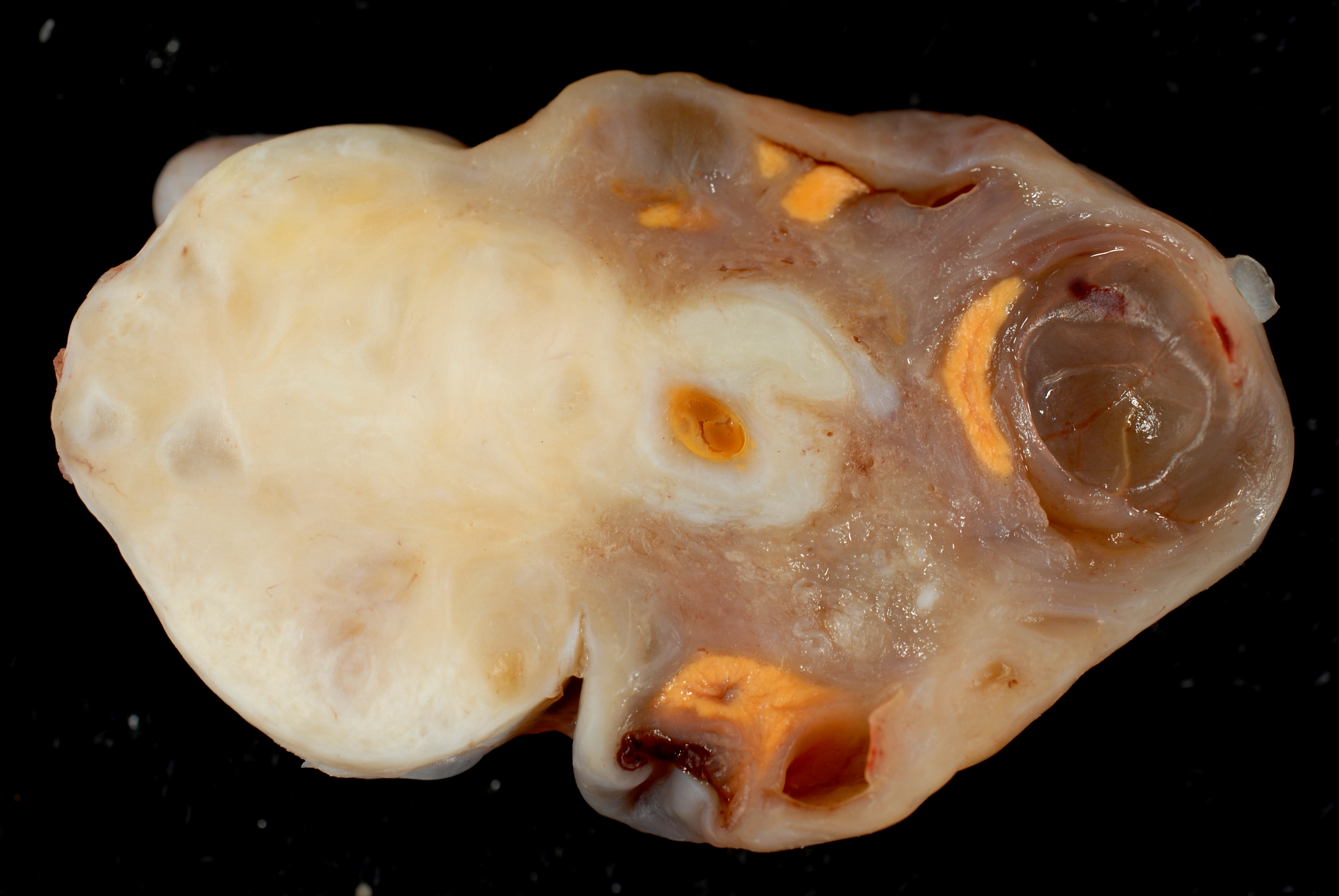
Ovarian fibroma (white part on the left)

The ovarian fibroma, also fibroma, is a benign sex cord-stromal tumour.

Ovarian fibromas represent 4% of all ovarian neoplasms. They tend to occur mostly during perimenopause and postmenopause, the median age having been reported to be about 52 years, and they are rare in children. Lesions tend to be asymptomatic. If symptoms are present, the most common one is abdominal pain.

On gross pathology, they are firm and white or tan. On microscopic examination, there are intersecting bundles of spindle cells producing collagen.

There may be thecomatous areas (fibrothecoma). The presence of an ovarian fibroma can cause ovarian torsion in some cases.

== Diagnosis ==
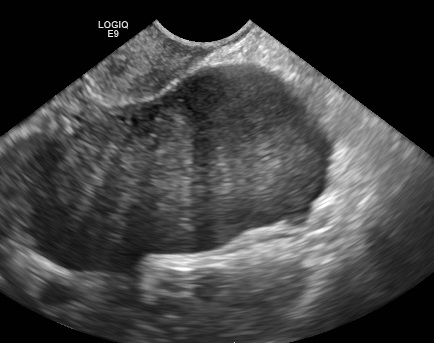
ovarian fibroma in ultrasound

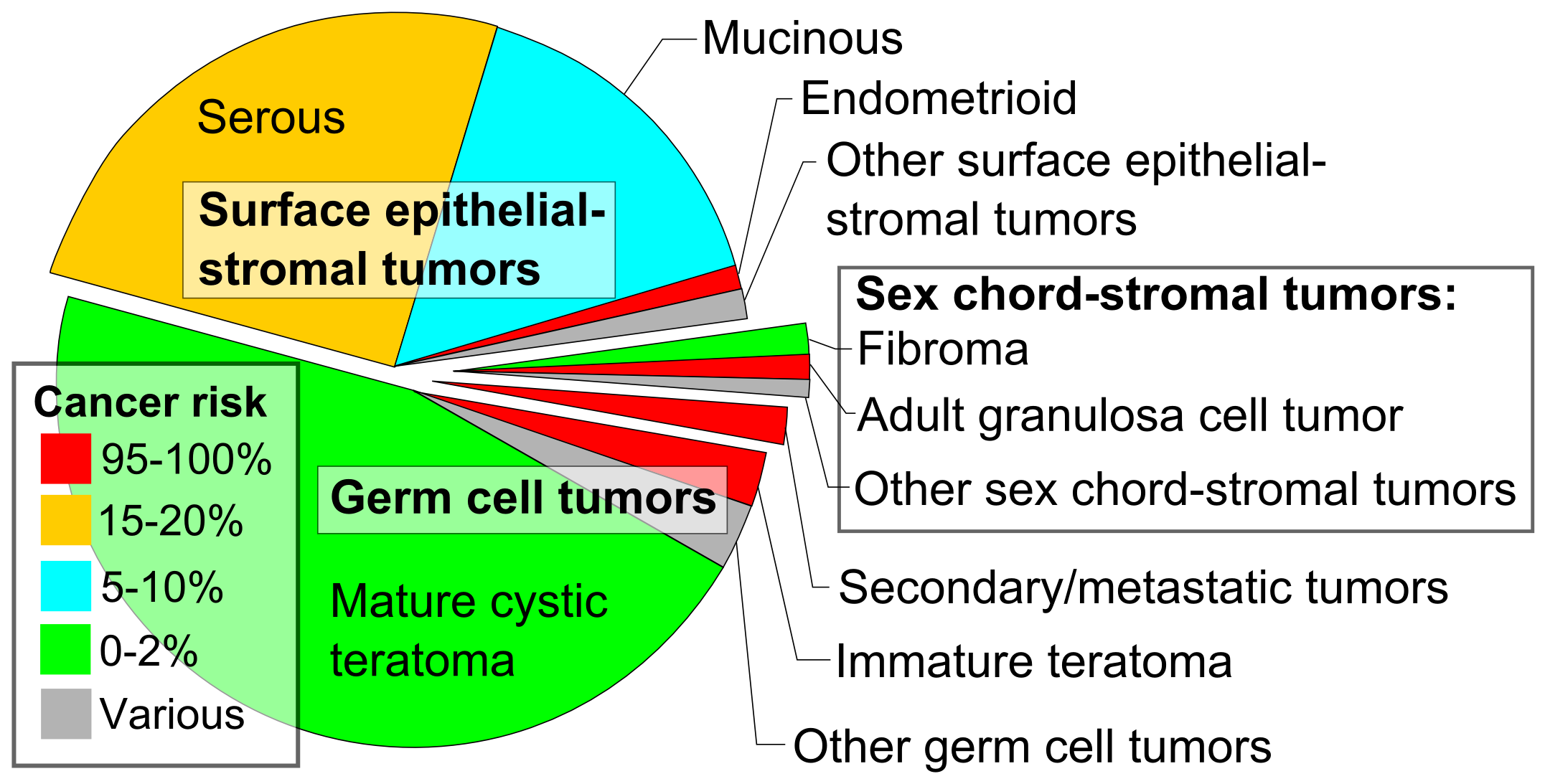
Ovarian tumors by incidence and risk of ovarian cancer, with fibroma at right.

Diagnosis is usually made by ultrasonography showing a solid ovarian lesion, or, on some occasions, mixed tumors with solid and cystic components. Computed tomography and magnetic resonance imaging can also be used to diagnose fibromas. In a series of 16 patients, 5 (28%) showed elevated levels of CA-125. Histopathology demonstrates spindle-shaped fibroblastic cells and abundant collagen.

== Treatment ==
Usually the lesion is surgically removed. Primarily, there is concern that the lesion identified in a patient could be cancerous, but there is also the risk of torsion, and possibly the development of symptoms. A stable lesion, however, could be clinically followed.

== Associations ==
Variants with edema can be associated with Meigs' syndrome. They may be a part of nevoid basal cell carcinoma syndrome (Gorlin syndrome).
