= Gonadal torsion =

Gonadal torsion refers to torsion of the gonads. It may refer to:

- Testicular torsion
- Ovarian torsion
