= International Ovarian Tumor Analysis trial =

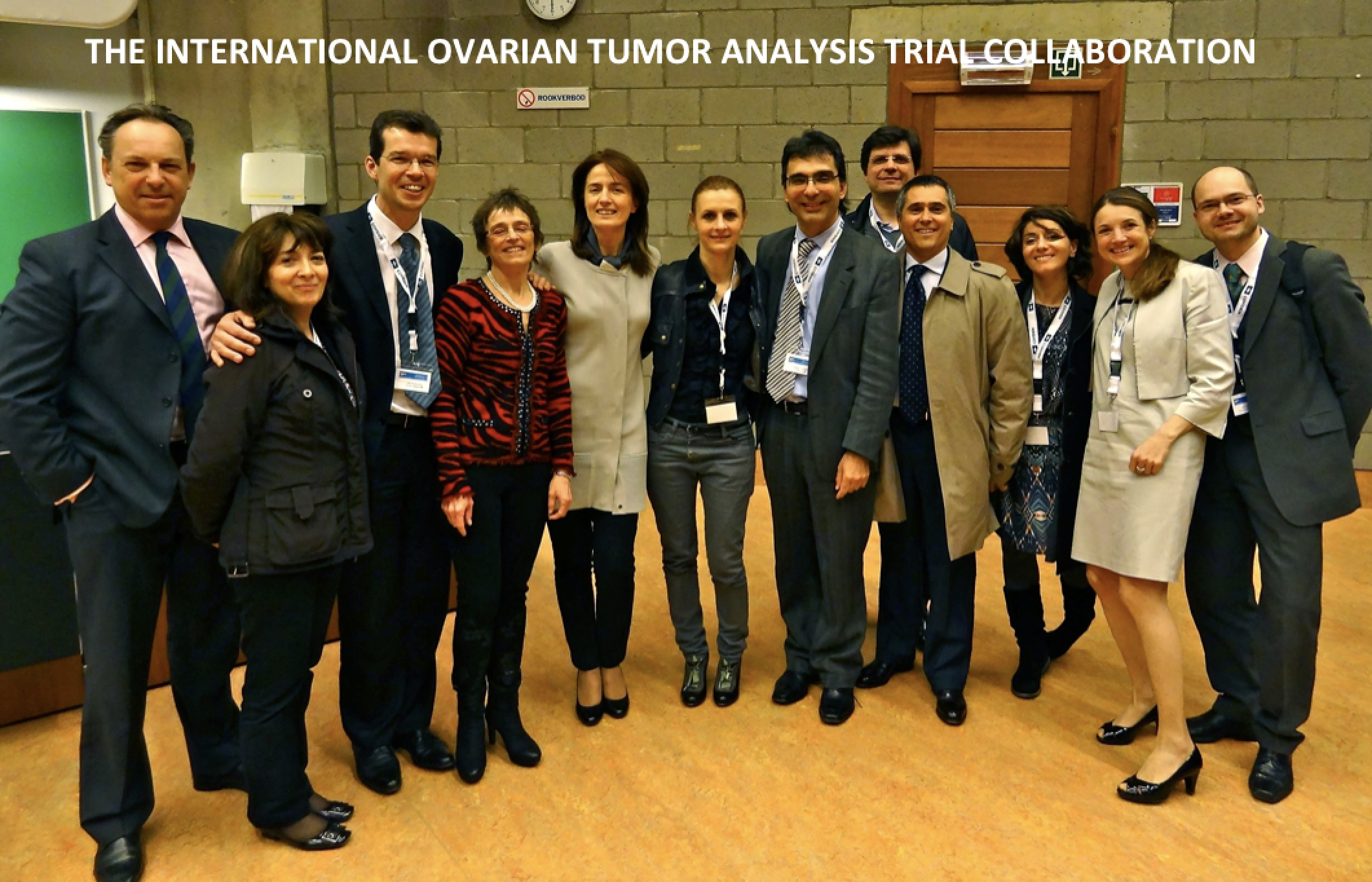
Members of the IOTA group at the biannual meeting in Leuven

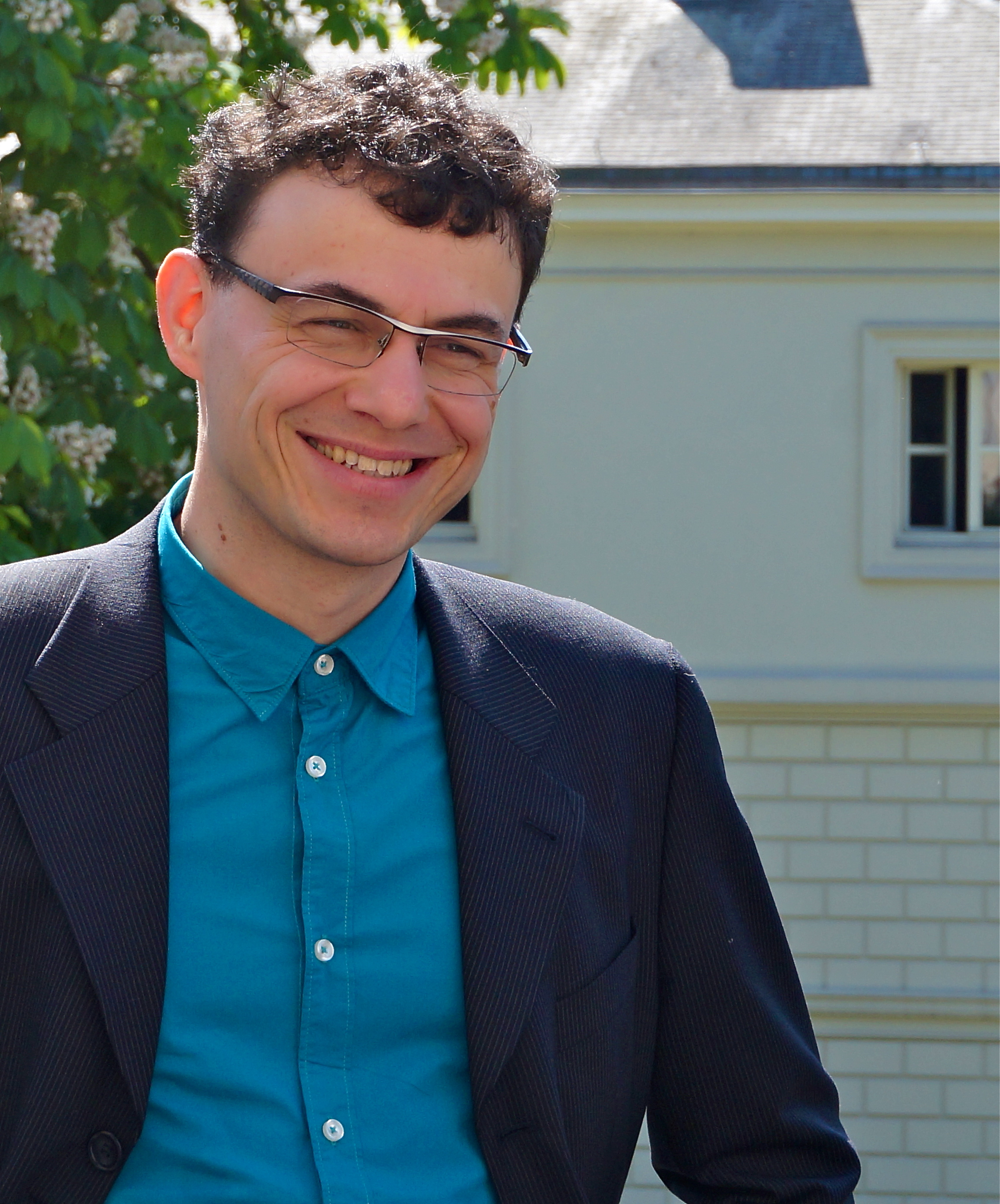
Ben Van Calster - the lead statistician for the IOTA project

The International Ovarian Tumor Analysis (IOTA) group was formed in 1999 by Dirk Timmerman (KU Leuven, Belgium), Tom Bourne (Imperial College London, London, UK), and Lil Valentin (Lund University, Sweden). Its first aim was to develop standardised terminology, and in 2000 IOTA published a consensus statement on terms, definitions and measurements to describe the sonographic features of adnexal masses that is now widely used today. IOTA now comprises one of a portfolio of studies examining many aspects of gynaecological ultrasonography and early pregnancy within a network of contributing centres throughout the world that are coordinated from KU Leuven

Having agreed on standardised terminology the principal IOTA investigators prospectively studied a large cohort of patients with a persistent adnexal mass in several different clinical centres. This database and the close involvement of the civil engineering department at KU Leuven has enabled both previously developed prediction models to be tested and novel prediction models to be developed and externally validated . In this way IOTA has been able to refine the optimal approach to characterise adnexal pathology preoperatively. IOTA has also described simple ultrasound based rules that can be used to classify ovarian cysts and so diagnose "ovarian cancer". These can be applied in about 75% of masses. For the remainder, a further scan by a sub-specialist is recommended. Another approach has to use simple descriptors, which are intuitive features of masses that an ultrasound examiner can use to easily classify about 50% of masses. Summaries of the IOTA studies have been published as reviews.

Currently IOTA is engaged in several new studies. The group are studying the long-term behaviour of expectantly managed adnexal pathology (IOTA phase 5). This will answer important questions about complications and malignant transformation in masses that are left in situ. A number of studies are being carried out on masses that currently are difficult to classify even for the most experienced examiner. These studies involve the use of vascular imaging, proteomics, novel Biomarkers and MRI to name but a few (IOTA phase 3). Finally a clinical trial is taking place in London (IOTA phase 4) to evaluate the performance of IOTA prediction models and rules in the hands of examiners with different levels of experience and training. Two paper have been published from the IOTA 4 study that suggest that IOTA rules and models to work when they are not applied by experts.

Today there are over 50 clinical units contributing to IOTA studies in nearly every continent. The culture of IOTA is to be transparent and open to new collaborators. The group is multidisciplinary and involves gynaecologists, radiologists, oncologists – as well as physicists and biologists. The group believes that good communication between all these disciplines is how ideas can be turned into improvements for patients. 2013 marked new developments for IOTA. Having focused on research, the group had the first IOTA congress and the development of the IOTA website. Having established a platform of clinical research centres IOTA will be planning further studies investigating aspects of ovarian cancer management and outcome prediction.

== IOTA steering committee ==
- Dirk Timmerman, University Hospitals, KU Leuven, Belgium
- Tom Bourne, Imperial College London, London and KU Leuven, Belgium
- Lil Valentin, Skåne University Hospital Malmö, Lund University, Malmö, Sweden
- Ben Van Calster, KU Leuven, Belgium
- Antonia Testa, Università Cattolica del Sacro Cuore, Rome, Italy
- Ignace Vergote, KU Leuven, Belgium
- Sabine Van Huffel, KU Leuven, Belgium

== IOTA websites ==
- iotagroup.org
- iota.education
