= Van Wyk and Grumbach syndrome =

- Other names: Van Wyk-Grumbach syndrome (VWGS)
- Specialty: Endocrine

Van Wyk and Grumbach syndrome is a medical condition defined by a combination of hypothyroidism, precocious puberty (with delayed bone age and lack of pubic hair), and ovarian cysts in pre- and post-pubertal girls or macroorchidism (unusually large testes) in boys.

== Presentation ==
Symptoms are ascites, pleural and pericardial effusions, elevated ovarian tumour markers, enlarged pituitary gland and elevated prolactin and alpha-fetoprotein levels.

== Mechanism ==
The presumed pathogenesis is that primary hypothyroidism causes enlargement and hyperstimulation of the pituitary gland which in turn cause ovarian hyperstimulation, ovarian cysts and precocious puberty.

== Diagnosis ==
Diagnosis is made by imaging/sonography and thyroid hormone tests.

== Treatment ==
The syndrome usually responds well to thyroid hormone replacement with complete resolution of symptoms.

== History ==
The syndrome was described in 1960 by Van Wyk and Melvin M. Grumbach.
