= Peritoneal inclusion cyst =

- Other names: Benign multicystic peritoneal mesothelioma
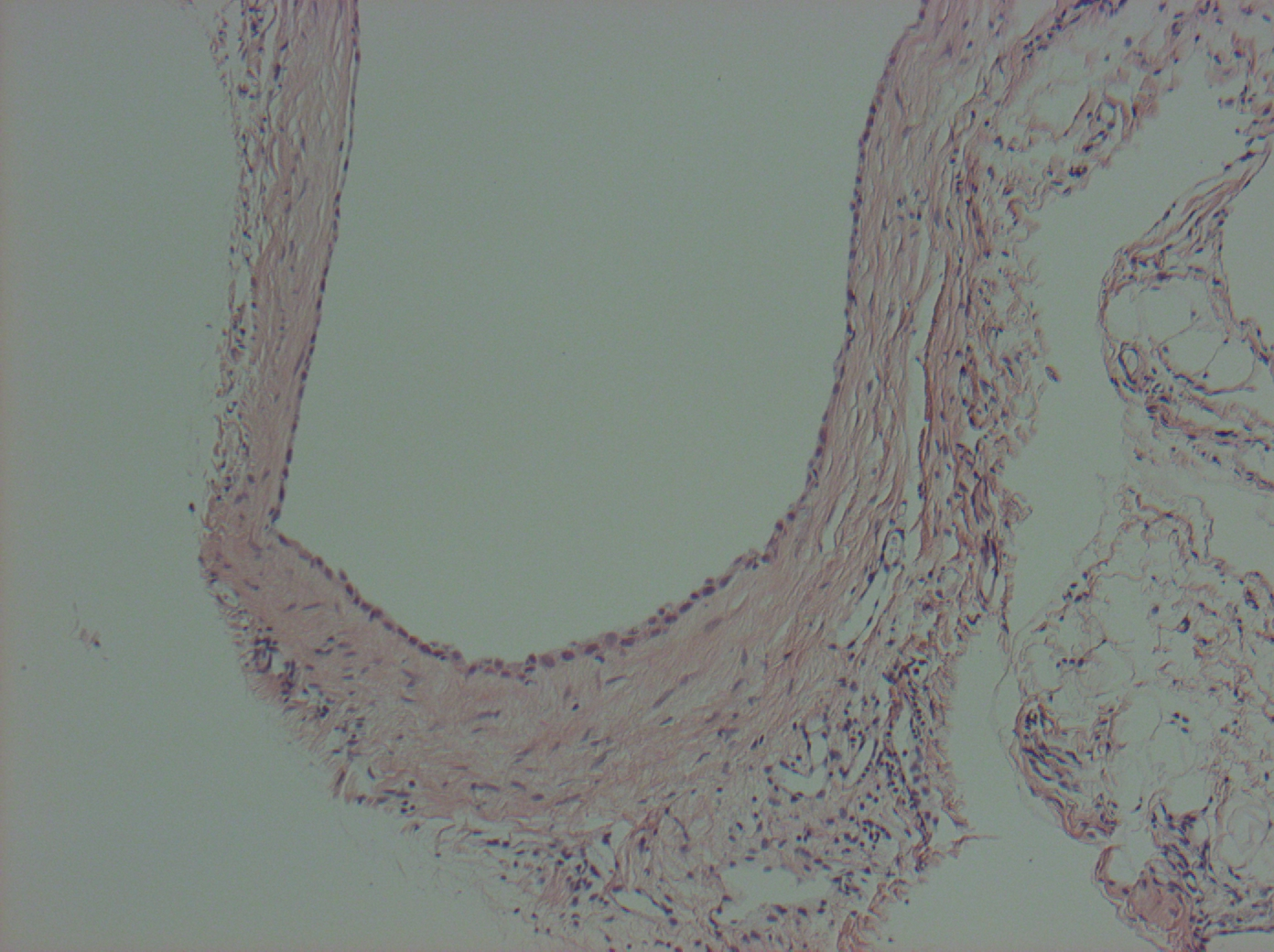
- Peritoneal inclusion cyst
- Specialty: Dermatology

A peritoneal inclusion cyst is a cyst-like structure that appears in the pelvis due to non neoplastic reactive mesothelial proliferation, often as a consequence of prior episodes of pelvic inflammation, as can occur in pelvic inflammatory disease. It has the potential to mimic ovarian cysts, hydrosalpinx or even malignancy, due to its nonspecific anechoic appearance.

== Signs and symptoms ==
The most common symptoms of a peritoneal inclusion cyst are persistent abdominal or pelvic pain and a subjectively palpable abdominal mass. Often, a physical examination reveals no palpable mass in the abdomen or pelvis. The symptoms can last for days or months at a time. Acute or chronic pelvic pain, back pain, dyspareunia, hernia, constipation, tenesmus, urinary frequency, urinary incontinence, anorexia, dysfunctional uterine bleeding, infertility, postmenopausal bleeding, and pulmonary embolism due to compression and venous stasis are some other reported presentations.

== Causes ==
Peritoneal inclusion cysts are almost exclusively seen in premenopausal women who have had endometriosis, trauma, pelvic inflammatory illness, or previous abdominal or pelvic surgery.

== Diagnosis ==
Peritoneal inclusion cysts are commonly visualized on ultrasonography as a spider-web-like pattern. A normal-looking ovary is encircled by a big, irregular or oval, echolucent cyst with fine internal septations. The ovary is frequently located in the middle of the inclusion cyst or on its lateral aspect, appearing to be dangling inside the cyst. Peritoneal inclusion cysts appear as a cystic mass with regular or irregular boundaries on CT scans, including material that has fluid or hemorrhagic attenuation properties. Cystic lesions with low T1 signal and high T2 signal, consistent with serous fluid, are shown on MR imaging.

Differential diagnoses for peritoneal inclusion cysts include mesothelial hyperplasia, non-granulomatous histiocytic lesions, granulomatous lesions, and Müllerian lesions, among other tumour-like peritoneal lesions.

== Treatment ==
Clinical symptoms determine the best course of treatment for peritoneal inclusion cysts. When a patient is asymptomatic, ultrasonographic surveillance is recommended. For chronic cysts, aspiration or drainage is a safe, less invasive treatment option. When there is any suspicion of malignancy, surgical therapy in the form of a laparoscopy or laparotomy with full excision of the cyst is usually needed.
