= Frozen pelvis =

Medical condition

Frozen pelvis is a severe complication of other medical conditions, especially endometriosis and cancer.

Normally, the internal organs in the pelvic cavity, such as the urinary bladder, the ovaries, the uterus, and the large intestine, are separate from each other. As a result, they are able to move or slide as the body moves, and it is possible for a surgeon to reach between two organs, without cutting into them, during abdominal surgery. In this condition, they are attached together by internal scars or adhesions and cannot move freely or be separated without cutting.

== Symptoms ==
Frozen pelvis can cause chronic pelvic pain. Because these internal organs are attached to each other, they cannot move normally. This results in pain whenever an improperly attached organ moves, including during bowel movements, urination, menstruation, and sexual intercourse. Involvement of any pelvic nerves can cause neuropathic pain. The symptoms vary according to which organs are attached, and how tightly they are attached.

== Causes ==
Frozen pelvis is often caused by endometriosis.

It can also be caused by cancer, such as late-stage ovarian cancers and rectal cancers. Abdominal actinomycosis can produce frozen pelvis in its later stages, especially after removal of an intrauterine contraceptive device. Infections (such as pelvic inflammatory disease), internal scars from abdominal surgery, non-cancerous growths, and internal scars from radiation therapy can also cause frozen pelvis. Genital tuberculosis is a relatively common cause of infertility in some countries, such as India, and can cause frozen pelvis.

== Diagnosis ==
Frozen pelvis may be discovered during pelvic surgery. Sometimes, the results of a CT scan suggest frozen pelvis.

=== Classification ===
Frozen pelvis is sometimes classified into one of several patterns:

Centrifugal
Typical of endometriosis
Centripetal
Rarer, but more severe
Left-frozen
Affecting primarily the left side, near the sigmoid colon
Complete
All organs are attached together.

== Outcomes ==
If undiagnosed and untreated, complications can include bowel obstruction, several kinds of hydronephrosis and other damage to the urinary tract, and damage to pelvic nerves.

Frozen pelvis is difficult to manage if abdominal surgery is needed, because the anatomical landmarks, which surgeons use to locate and avoid delicate structures and nearby organs, are distorted or hidden behind adhesions. The surgeon may be unable to complete the surgery safely. With a frozen pelvis, the rate of reported surgical complications is 2% overall, and as high as 24% if the adhesions extend to the large intestine.
