= Corpus luteum cyst =

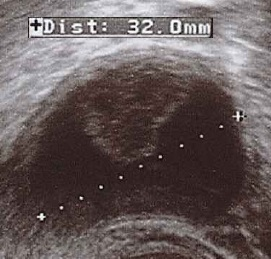
- Corpus luteum cyst with bleeding. Fresh blood is anechoic (black). A protrusion of coagulated blood (lighter in color) can also be seen in the top of the cyst.
- Specialty: Gynaecology

A corpus luteum cyst or luteal cyst is a type of ovarian cyst which may rupture about the time of menstruation, and take up to three months to disappear entirely. A corpus luteum cyst does not often occur in women over the age of 50, because eggs are no longer being released after menopause. Corpus luteum cysts may contain blood and other fluids. The physical shape of a corpus luteum cyst may appear as an enlargement of the ovary itself, rather than a distinct mass-like growth on the surface of the ovary.

== Signs and symptoms ==
Corpus luteum cysts are a normal part of the menstrual cycle. They can, however, grow to almost 10 cm (3.9 in) in diameter and have the potential to bleed into themselves or twist the ovary, causing pelvic or abdominal pain. It is possible the cyst may rupture, causing internal bleeding and pain. This pain typically disappears within a few days of the rupture. If the corpus luteum becomes large it may cause ovarian torsion, where the ovary twists and blood flow is cut off. Ovarian torsion is rare and is accompanied by severe pain.

== Pathophysiology ==
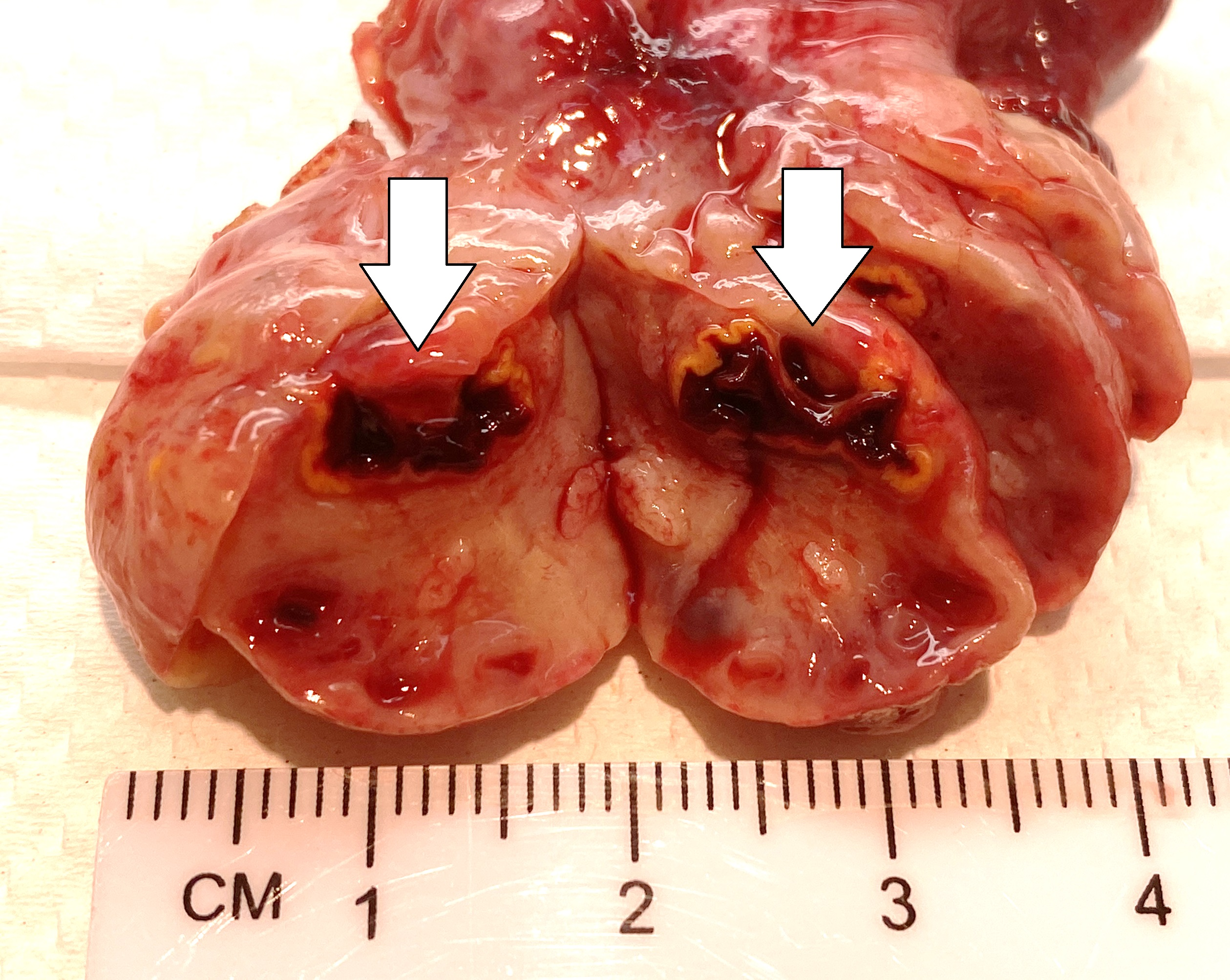
Gross pathology of a corpus luteum cyst with bleeding

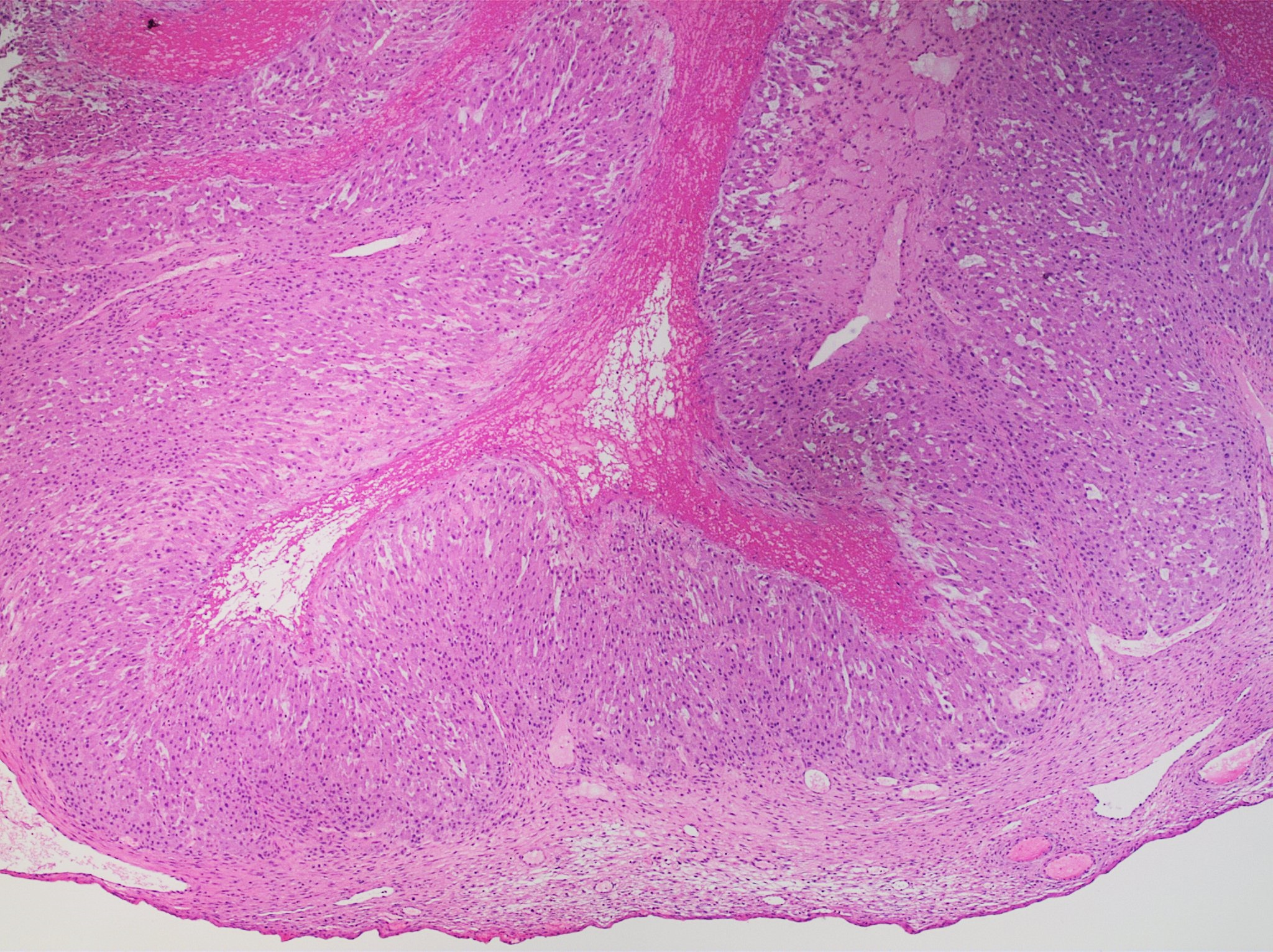
Histopathology of a corpus luteum cyst, H&E stain, low magnification, showing a convoluted layer of mainly granulosa lutein cells, surrounding a fibrous to hemorrhagic center.

This type of functional cyst occurs after an egg has been released from a follicle. The follicle then becomes a secretory gland that is known as the corpus luteum. The ruptured follicle begins producing large quantities of estrogen and progesterone in preparation for conception. If a pregnancy doesn't occur, the corpus luteum usually breaks down and disappears. It may, however, fill with fluid or blood, causing the corpus luteum to expand into a cyst, and stay in the ovary. Usually, this cyst is on only one side, and does not produce any symptoms.

In women of reproductive age, cysts with a diameter of less than 5 cm (2.0 in) are common, clinically inconsequential, and almost always a physiological condition rather than cancer or another medical condition. In postmenopausal women the threshold for concern is 1 cm (0.39 in). Although ovarian cancer may be cystic, it does not arise from benign corpus luteum cysts. Medical specialty professional organizations recommend no follow-up imaging for cysts which are considered clinically inconsequential.

A ruptured corpus luteum can cause hemoperitoneum with abdominal pain, and is a common condition in women of reproductive age. It may be confused with ectopic pregnancy.

== Interaction with medication ==
The fertility drug clomiphene citrate (Clomid, Serophene), used to induce ovulation, increases the risk of a corpus luteum cyst developing after ovulation. These cysts do not prevent or threaten a resulting pregnancy. Women on birth control pills usually do not form these cysts; in fact, preventing these cysts is one way birth control pills work. In contrast, the progesterone-only pill can cause increased frequency of these cysts.
