= Ovarian tumor =

Benign, borderline, or malignant neoplasm involving the ovary

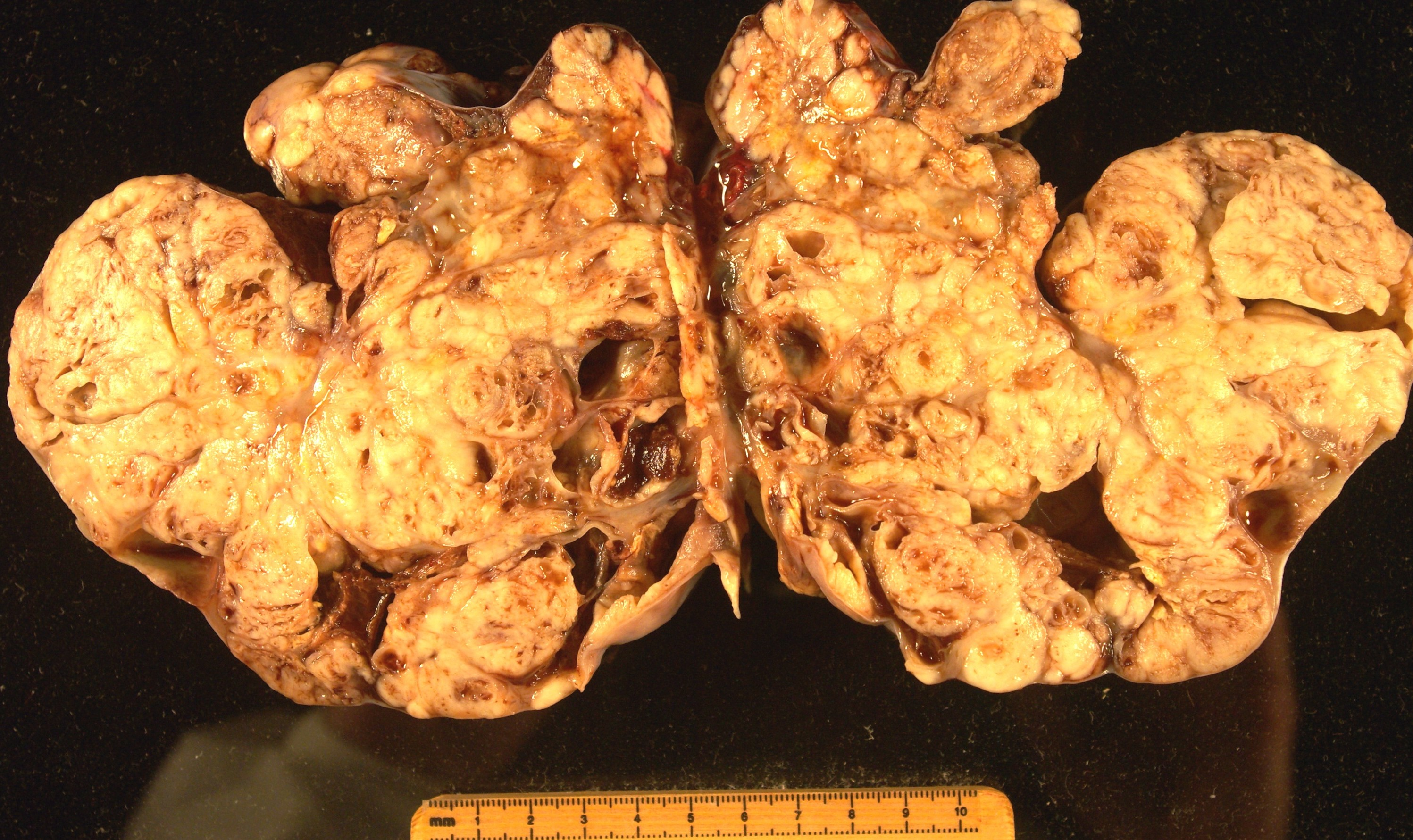
Gross pathology of an ovarian carcinoma.

Ovarian tumors, or ovarian neoplasms, are tumors in the ovary. Not all are ovarian cancer. They consist of mainly solid tissue, while ovarian cysts contain fluid.

In 2020, the World Health Organization (WHO) divided ovarian cancerous tumours as 90% epithelial, 3% germ cell, and 2% sex cord-stromal types.

== Histopathologic classification ==
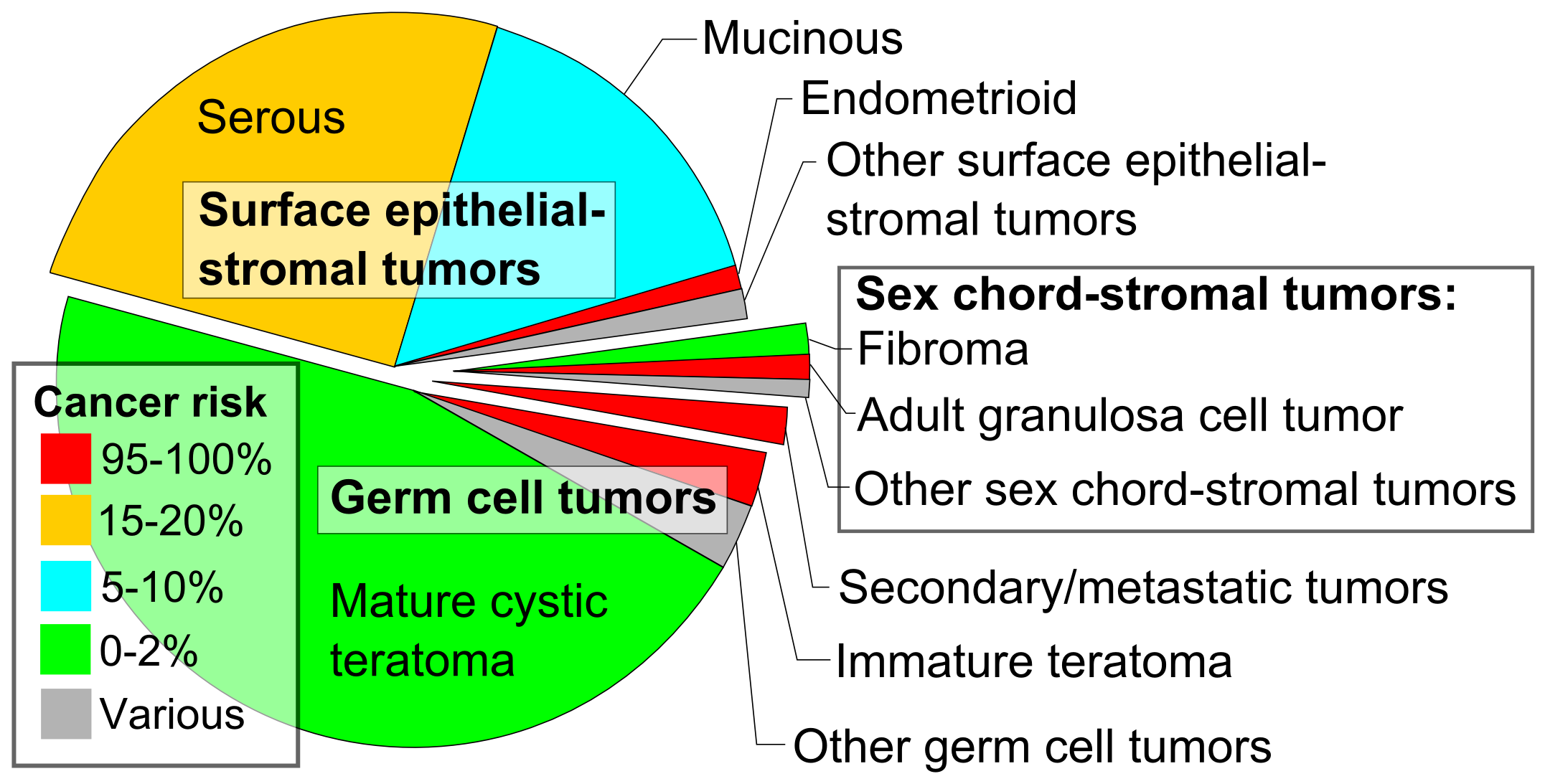
Ovarian tumors by incidence and risk of ovarian cancer

Tumor of the ovary vary remarkably as they may arise from any of the 3 cell types of the normal ovary.

Ovarian tumors are classified according to the histology of the tumor, obtained in a pathology report. Histology dictates many aspects of clinical treatment, management, and prognosis.

The most common forms are:

Type	Subtype	Relative incidence	Percent malignant	Comments	Micrograph
Germ cell tumor	Mature cystic teratoma	46.0%	0.17% to 2%	Cystic, with elements of all 3 germ layers (endoderm, mesoderm and ectoderm).	Hair follicles.
Germ cell tumor	Immature teratoma	2.5%	100%	A teratoma that contains anaplastic immature elements, and is often synonymous with malignant teratoma.	
Germ cell tumor	Other germ cell tumors	3.0%		Others mainly include dysgerminoma, yolk sac tumor, struma ovarii and squamous cell carcinoma arising from a dermoid cyst, and malignant mixed germ cell tumor.	
Surface epithelial-stromal tumor	Serous tumor	25%	18.5%	Benign serous tumors of the right ovarian cyst are thinwalled unilocular cysts that are lined by ciliated pseudostratified cuboidal or columnar epithelium.	
Surface epithelial-stromal tumor	Mucinous tumor	15%	8.8%	Benign mucinous tumors of the ovary consist of simple, nonstratified columnar epithelium with basally-located hyperchromatic nuclei and resemble gastric foveolar epithelium.	
Surface epithelial-stromal tumor	Endometrioid tumor	1%	Almost 100%	Tubular glands, resembling endometrium.	
Surface epithelial-stromal tumor	Other surface-epithelial tumors	1.5%		Others include mainly malignant mixed Müllerian tumor, Brenner tumor and mixed epithelial tumor.	Brenner tumor.
Sex cord-stromal tumor	Ovarian fibroma	1.5%	0%	Spindle-shaped fibroblastic cells and abundant collagen.	
Sex cord-stromal tumor	Adult granulosa cell tumor	1%	Almost 100%	Small, bland, cuboidal to polygonal cells in various patterns.	
Sex cord-stromal tumor	Other sex cord-stromal tumors	1%		Others include mainly juvenile granulosa cell tumor, thecoma and sclerosing stromal tumor	
Secondary/metastatic) tumor		2%	100%	Usually from breast cancer, colon cancer, endometrial cancer, stomach cancer or cervical cancer.	

Mixed tumors contain elements of more than one of the above classes of tumor histology.

== History ==
An 1882 article appearing in Scientific American mentions the case of a patient at University of Pennsylvania Hospital when Dr. William Goodell removed a 112 lbs tumor from a 31 year old patient, who weighted 75 lbs after removal from the tumor.

== See also ==
- International Ovarian Tumor Analysis trial
