= Follicular cyst of ovary =

Follicular cyst of the ovary
- Other names: Graafian follicle cyst, follicular cyst
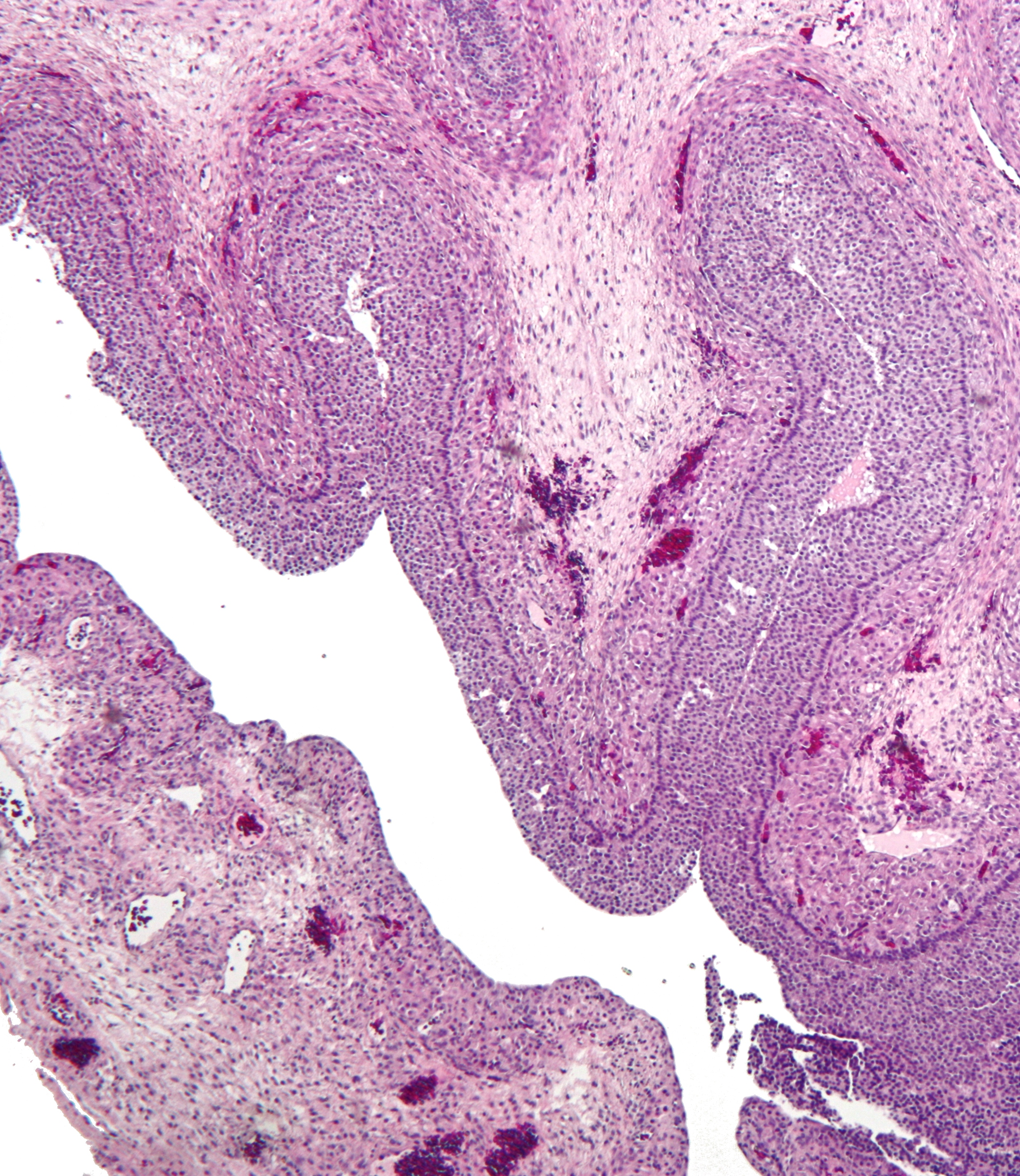
- Micrograph of a luteinized follicular cyst of the ovary. H&E stain.
- Specialty: Gynecology

The follicular cyst of the ovary (follicle cyst) is a type of functional cyst, and is the most common type of ovarian cyst.

== Signs and symptoms ==
Its rupture can create sharp, severe pain on the side of the ovary on which the cyst appears. This sharp pain (sometimes called mittelschmerz) occurs in the middle of the menstrual cycle, during ovulation. About a fourth of women with this type of cyst experience pain. Usually, these cysts produce no symptoms and disappear by themselves within a few months.

== Pathophysiology ==
This type can form when ovulation doesn't occur, and a follicle doesn't rupture or release its egg but instead grows until it becomes a cyst, or when a mature follicle involutes (collapses on itself). It usually forms during ovulation, and can grow to about 7 cm in diameter. It is thin-walled, lined by one or more layers of granulosa cell, and filled with clear fluid.

== Diagnosis ==
Ultrasound is the primary tool used to document the follicular cyst. A doctor monitors these to make sure they disappear, and looks at treatment options if they do not.

== See also ==
- Folliculogenesis
- Ovarian cyst
- Polyendocrine metabolic ovarian syndrome
