= Endometrioma =

Endometriosis of ovary
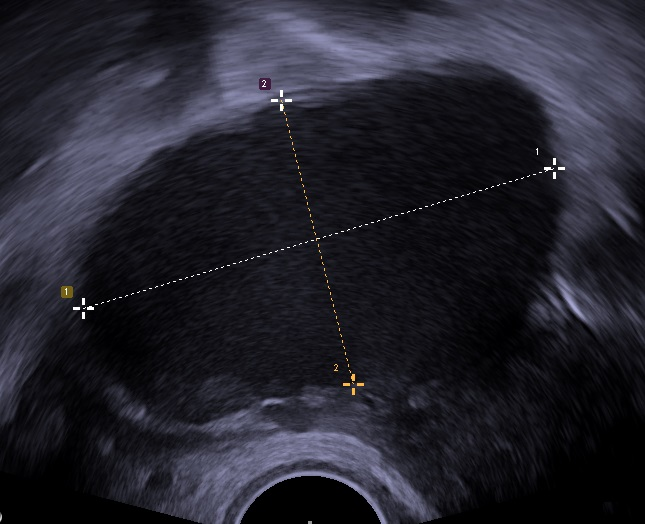
- Transvaginal ultrasonography showing a 67 × 40 mm endometrioma as distinguished from other types of ovarian cysts by a somewhat grainy and not completely anechoic content.
- Specialty: Gynecology

Endometrioma (also called chocolate cyst) is the presence of tissue similar to, but distinct from, the endometrium—the lining of the uterus (womb)—in and sometimes on the ovary. It is the most common form of endometriosis. Endometrioma is found in 17–44% patients with endometriosis.

More broadly, endometriosis is the presence of tissue similar to, but distinct from, endometrial tissue located outside the uterus. The presence of endometriosis can result in the formation of scar tissue, adhesions and an inflammatory reaction.

Endometriomas are usually benign growths, most often found in the ovary. They form dark, fluid-filled cysts, which can vary greatly in size. The fluid inside the cysts is thick, dark, old blood that resembles the color of chocolate, giving it the name chocolate cyst. It can also develop in the cul-de-sac (the space behind the uterus), the surface of the uterus, and between the vagina and rectum.

== Pathophysiology ==
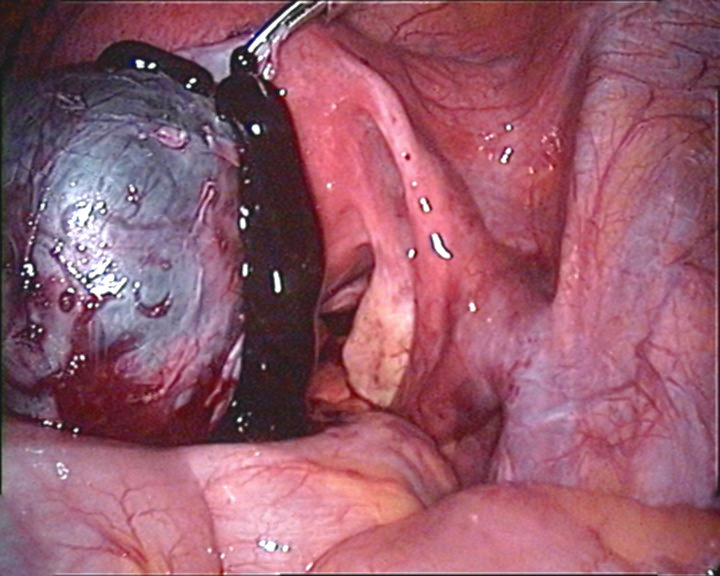
Endoscopic image of a ruptured chocolate cyst in left ovary.

Endometrial tissue is the mucous membrane that normally lines the uterus. The endometrium is richly supplied with blood and its growth is regulated by estrogen and progesterone. It consists of glandular and stroma tissue from the lining of the uterus. When the endometrial mucous membrane is found outside of the uterus in places such as the ovaries, it causes chronic pelvic pain with intercourse and menstrual cycles.

Endometriomas can produce a toxic environment by producing estrogen, cytokines, interleukins, and other inflammatory substances, that could damage healthy endometriomal tissue. This toxic fluid content can cause dire alterations to the normal surrounding endometriotic cells, potentially impacting the embryo, the ability of an embryo to implant successfully, and the responsiveness of the endometrium. Endometrioma can potentially lead to premature ovarian failure, decreased ovarian function, or problems with ovulation. Studies have also found that endometriomas occur two times more frequently in the left ovary (67%) than in the right one (33%), possibly due to the presence of the sigmoid colon on the left side.

== Signs and symptoms ==
Common symptoms of endometrioma include:

- Chronic pelvic pain
- Dysmenorrhea (painful menstruation)
- Dyspareunia (painful intercourse)
- Infertility or subfertility
- Pelvic pressure or a sensation of fullness

== Risks ==
Endometriomas can increase the risk of ovarian cancer in reproductive women, decrease normal ovarian function, and cause pain in the pelvis during or after periods or during sexual intercourse. Although most endometriomas are found to be benign, the possibility of malignant tumors still exists, and surgery is needed to confirm malignancy and determine what future treatment must be administered.

Another factor that endometrioma can impact is the ovarian reserve, or the number of quality follicles left in the ovary to produce viable eggs. Ovaries with endometriomas showed significantly less follicular density as compared to healthy ovaries, leading to a decrease in fertility.

== Treatment ==
=== Medication ===
Nonsteroidal anti-inflammatory drugs (NSAIDs) are frequently used first in patients with pelvic pain, particularly if the diagnosis of endometriosis has not been definitively (excision and biopsy) established. The goal of directed medical treatment is to achieve an anovulatory state. Typically, this is achieved initially using hormonal contraception. This can also be accomplished with progestational agents (i.e., medroxyprogesterone acetate), danazol, gestrinone, or gonadotropin-releasing hormone(GnRH) agonists, as well as other less well-known agents. These agents are generally used if oral contraceptives and NSAIDs are ineffective. GnRH agonists can be combined with estrogen and progestogen (add-back therapy) without loss of efficacy but with fewer hypoestrogenic symptoms. These medications are often ineffective in treating endometriomas and any relief is short lived while taking the medications. Therapy with these agents has a large number of sometimes permanent side effects, such as hot flushes, loss of bone mass, deepening of voice, weight gain, and facial hair growth.

=== Surgery ===
Surgery (usually laparoscopic cystectomy) is often considered when endometrioma is >4–5 cm, significant pain persists despite medical therapy, infertility evaluation is needed, malignancy cannot be excluded or when cyst continues to enlarge despite conservative management. (Note: Conservative management for Endometrioma include medical therapy and watchful waiting.) Laparoscopic surgical approaches include excision of ovarian adhesions and of endometriomas. Endometriomas require surgical removal and excision is considered to be superior to cyst vaporization or coagulation in terms of permanent removal of the disease and pain relief. Surgery can sometimes have the effect of improving fertility but can have the adverse effect of leading to increases in cycle day 2 or 3 FSH for many patients. It can also pose the risk of diminishing the ovarian reserve, which could lead to post-surgery infertility. The removal of healthy ovarian tissue or compromising blood flow to the ovary are both risk factors of the surgery that could lead to detrimental affects on the ovarian reserve. However, despite the fact that there is a risk of loss of ovarian function, studies have shown the recurrence rate of endometrioma is reduced.

Recurrence rate after the surgery varies from 5 to 20%.

== Bibliography ==
- Venes, Donald (2013). Taber, Clarence Wilbur (ed.). Taber's cyclopedic medical dictionary (Ed. 22, illustrated in full color ed.). Philadelphia: F.A. Davis. ISBN 9780803629783. OCLC 808316462.
