= Pelvic nerve =

Pelvic nerve may refer to:

- pelvic splanchnic nerve
- sacral nerves, the spinal nerves that arise from vertebral column through the sacrum. The roots of these nerves begin inside of the vertebral column in the level of the L1 vertebra and they extend until the sacrum forming a structure called the cauda equina
