= Ovarian torsion =

Twisting of an ovary such that blood flow is decreased

- Other names: Adnexal torsion

- Specialty: Gynecology
- Symptoms: Pelvic pain
- Complications: Infertility
- Usual onset: Classically sudden
- Risk factors: Ovarian cysts, ovarian enlargement, ovarian tumors, pregnancy, tubal ligation
- Diagnostic method: Based on symptoms, ultrasound, CT scan
- Differential diagnosis: Appendicitis, kidney infection, kidney stones, ectopic pregnancy
- Treatment: Surgery
- Frequency: 6 per 100,000 women per year

Ovarian torsion (OT) or adnexal torsion is an abnormal condition where an ovary twists on its attachment to other structures, such that blood flow is decreased. Symptoms typically include pelvic pain on one side. While classically the pain is sudden in onset, this is not always the case. Other symptoms may include nausea. Complications may include infection, bleeding, or infertility.

Risk factors include ovarian cysts, ovarian enlargement, ovarian tumors, pregnancy, fertility treatment, and prior tubal ligation. The diagnosis may be supported by an ultrasound done via the vagina or CT scan, but these do not completely rule out the diagnosis. Surgery is the most accurate method of diagnosis.

Treatment is by surgery to either untwist and fix the ovary in place or to remove it. The ovary will often recover, even if the condition has been present for some time. In those who have had a prior ovarian torsion, there is a 10% chance the other will also be affected. The diagnosis is relatively rare, affecting about 6 per 100,000 women per year. While it most commonly occurs in those of reproductive age, it can occur at any age.

== Signs and symptoms ==
Patients with ovarian torsion often present with sudden onset of sharp and usually unilateral lower abdominal pain, in 70% of cases accompanied by nausea and vomiting.

== Pathophysiology ==
The development of an ovarian mass is related to the development of torsion. In the reproductive years, regular growth of large corpus luteal cysts are a risk factor for rotation. The mass effect of ovarian tumors is also a common cause of torsion. Torsion of the ovary usually occurs with torsion of the fallopian tube as well on their shared vascular pedicle around the broad ligament, although in rare cases the ovary rotates around the mesovarium or the fallopian tube rotates around the mesosalpinx. In 80%, torsion happens unilaterally, with slight predominance on the right. In ovarian torsion, the ovary rotates around both the infundibulopelvic ligament (ie, suspensory ligament) and the utero-ovarian ligament (i.e. ovarian ligament), disrupting blood flow to the ovary.

== Diagnosis ==
Ovarian torsion is difficult to diagnose accurately, and operation is often performed before certain diagnosis is made. A study at an obstetrics and gynaecology department found that preoperative diagnosis of ovarian torsion was confirmed in only 46% of people.

=== Ultrasound ===
Gynecologic ultrasonography is the imaging modality of choice. Use of doppler ultrasound in the diagnosis has been suggested. However, doppler flow is frequently present in torsion – the definitive diagnosis is often made in the operating room.

Lack of ovarian blood flow on doppler sonography seems to be a good predictor of ovarian torsion. Women with pathologically low flow are more likely to have torsion. The sensitivity and specificity of abnormal ovarian flow are 44% and 92%, respectively, with a positive and negative predictive value of 78% and 71%, respectively. Specific flow features on Doppler sonography include:

- Little or no intra-ovarian venous flow. This is commonly seen in ovarian torsion.
- Absent arterial flow. This is a less common finding in ovarian torsion
- Absent or reversed diastolic flow

Normal vascularity does not exclude intermittent torsion. There may occasionally be normal Doppler flow because of the ovary's dual blood supply from both the ovarian arteries and uterine arteries.

Other ultrasonographic features include:

- Enlarged hypoechogenic or hyperechogenic ovary
- Peripherally displaced ovarian follicles
- Free pelvic fluid. This may be seen in more than 80% of cases
- Whirlpool sign of twisted vascular pedicle
- Underlying ovarian lesion can often be found
- Uterus may be slightly deviated towards the torted ovary.

== Treatment ==
Surgical treatment of ovarian torsion includes laparoscopy to uncoil the torsed ovary and possibly oophoropexy to fixate the ovary if it is likely to twist again. In severe cases, where blood flow is cut off to the ovary for an extended period of time, necrosis of the ovary can occur. In some of these cases the ovary must be surgically removed, however 90% of ovaries that appear necrotic will actually resume function at 3 months.

== Epidemiology ==
Ovarian torsion accounts for about 3% of gynecologic emergencies. The incidence of ovarian torsion among women of all ages is 5.9 per 100,000 women, and the incidence among women of reproductive age (15–45 years) is 9.9 per 100,000 women. In 70% of cases, it is diagnosed in women between 20 and 39 years of age. The risk is greater during pregnancy and in menopause. Risk factors include increased length of the ovarian ligaments, pathologically enlarged ovaries (more than 6 cm), ovarian masses or cysts, and enlarged corpus luteum in pregnancy.

== See also ==
- Testicular torsion – equivalent condition in males
