= TGIF =

TGIF may refer to:

== Arts and media ==
- TGIF (TV programming block), a former two-hour programming block on the American television network ABC
- "TGIF" (song), a song by GloRilla
- "Last Friday Night (T.G.I.F.)", a 2011 single by Katy Perry
- "T.G.I.F. (Thank God I'm Fresh)", a song by Kid Cudi from Man on the Moon: The End of Day
- "T.G.I.F.", a song by Lonestar from Let's Be Us Again
- "TGIF", a song by K.Flay from Inside Voices / Outside Voices
- "TGIF", a song by Le Tigre from Feminist Sweepstakes

== Science and technology ==
- Tgif (program), an interactive 2-D drawing tool under X11 for Unix and the file format it uses, .tgif
- Tactical Ground Intercept Facility, a US military intelligence collection platform
- Transforming growth interacting factor
  - TGIF1, a protein that in humans is encoded by the TGIF1 gene
  - TGIF2, a protein that in humans is encoded by the TGIF2 gene

== Other uses ==
- Thank God It's Friday (disambiguation)
- TGI Fridays, an American restaurant chain
