= Intelligence source and information reliability =

Rating systems used in intelligence analysis

Intelligence source and information reliability rating systems are used in intelligence analysis. This rating is used for information collected by a human intelligence collector. This type of information collection and job duty exists within many government agencies around the world.

According to Ewen Montagu, John Godfrey devised this system when he was director of the Naval Intelligence Division (N.I.D.) around the time of World War II.

The system employed by the United States Armed Forces rates the reliability of the source as well as the information. The source reliability is rated between A (history of complete reliability) to E (history of invalid information), with F for source without sufficient history to establish reliability level. The information content is rated between 1 (confirmed) to 5 (improbable), with 6 for information whose reliability can not be evaluated.

For example, a confirmed information from a reliable source has rating A1, an unknown-validity information from a new source without reputation is rated F6, an inconsistent illogical information from a known liar is E5, a confirmed information from a moderately doubtful source is C1.

The evaluation matrix as described in the Field Manual FM 2-22.3 (see also Admiralty code):

== Source reliability ==
	Rating	Description
A	Reliable	No doubt about the source's authenticity, trustworthiness, or competency. History of complete reliability.
B	Usually reliable	Minor doubts. History of mostly valid information.
C	Fairly reliable	Doubts. Provided valid information in the past.
D	Not usually reliable	Significant doubts. Provided valid information in the past.
E	Unreliable	Lacks authenticity, trustworthiness, and competency. History of invalid information.
F	Reliability unknown	Insufficient information to evaluate reliability. May or may not be reliable.

== Information credibility ==
	Rating	Description
1	Confirmed by independent Sources	Logical, consistent with other relevant information, confirmed by independent sources.
2	Probably true	Logical, consistent with other relevant information, not confirmed.
3	Possibly true	Reasonably logical, agrees with some relevant information, not confirmed.
4	Doubtfully True	Not logical but possible, no other information on the subject, not confirmed.
5	Improbable	Not logical, contradicted by other relevant information.
6	Difficult to say	The validity of the information can not be determined.
