= Admiralty code =

Intelligence reliability designator

The Admiralty System or NATO System is a method for evaluating collected items of intelligence. The system comprises a two-character notation assessing the reliability of the source and the assessed level of confidence on the information. The Admiralty system is used by NATO member nations and members of the Five Eyes community.

== Evaluation ==
Evaluation occurs in the processing stage of the intelligence cycle recognising that collected information cannot be accepted at face value. Each item of information used in the creation of an assessment is given an indication of source reliability and assessed accuracy, based on corroboration or other assessment. Each descriptor is considered in isolation to ensure that the reliability of the source does not influence the assessed accuracy of the report.

== Reliability ==
A source is assessed for reliability based on a technical assessment of its capability, or in the case of Human Intelligence sources their history. Notation uses Alpha coding, A-F:

- Reliability of Source

A - Completely reliable: No doubt of authenticity, trustworthiness, or competency; has a history of complete reliability
B - Usually reliable: Minor doubt about authenticity, trustworthiness, or competency; has a history of valid information most of the time
C - Fairly reliable: Doubt of authenticity, trustworthiness, or competency but has provided valid information in the past
D - Not usually reliable: Significant doubt about authenticity, trustworthiness, or competency but has provided valid information in the past
E - Unreliable: Lacking in authenticity, trustworthiness, and competency; history of invalid information
F - Reliability cannot be judged: No basis exists for evaluating the reliability of the source

== Credibility ==
An item is assessed for credibility based on likelihood and levels of corroboration by other sources. Notation uses a numeric code, 1-6.

- Accuracy of data

1 - Confirmed by other sources: Confirmed by other independent sources; logical in itself; Consistent with other information on the subject
2 - Probably True: Not confirmed; logical in itself; consistent with other information on the subject
3 - Possibly True: Not confirmed; reasonably logical in itself; agrees with some other information on the subject
4 - Doubtful: Not confirmed; possible but not logical; no other information on the subject
5 - Improbable: Not confirmed; not logical in itself; contradicted by other information on the subject
6 - Truth cannot be judged: No basis exists for evaluating the validity of the information

== Reporting ==
An assessment will provide a candidate course of action based on the coding of the items of collected information used to compile the assessment. The hypothesis will not be coded but the wording will caveat conclusions based on the levels of confidence indicated by the code.

== See also ==
- Military intelligence
- Intelligence source and information reliability
