= Benign metastasizing leiomyoma =

- Specialty: Obstetrics and gynecology; Oncology
- Symptoms: Respiratory symptoms (cough, chest pain, difficulty breathing)
- Usual onset: ~ 47 years old
- Risk factors: Prior uterine leiomyoma resection procedure
- Diagnostic method: Imaging studies (CT, PET), definitive diagnosis on histology
- Differential diagnosis: Lung carcinoma, leiomyosarcoma, hamartoma, perivascular epithelioid cell tumor, infectious disease
- Treatment: Surgical resection, medications (GnRH agonists, SERMs, aromatase inhibitors)
- Prognosis: Favorable
- Frequency: Rare

Benign metastasizing leiomyoma (BML) is a condition in which leiomyoma cells are found outside of the uterus. This typically occurs in premenopausal women who have previously undergone surgical resection of uterine leiomyoma(s). Lesions most commonly occur in the lungs. Patients are usually asymptomatic but may have symptoms related to the location of the lesion(s). Many theories have been proposed as to how BML develops. These include hematogenous spread, peritoneal seeding, mesenchymal metaplasia in response to hormonal stimulation, and de novo development from local smooth muscle cells.

BML is often discovered incidentally on imaging studies but is definitively diagnosed on histology. There is no standardized treatment for BML due to its variable presentation. Treatment options include observation with serial imaging, pharmacotherapy, and surgical resection. The prognosis is favorable with only a small percentage of lesions undergoing malignant transformation.

== Signs/symptoms ==
In most cases, BML is asymptomatic and discovered incidentally. When symptoms are present, they vary based on the location of the lesion(s). Respiratory symptoms are most common, as the lungs are the most frequent extrauterine site for these lesions to develop. These symptoms can range from shortness of breath, cough, and chest pain, to complete respiratory failure.

== Pathogenesis ==
The pathogenesis of benign metastasizing leiomyoma (BML) has not yet been well defined but several hypotheses exist within the literature. The most widely recognized theory is that uterine leiomyoma cells are disrupted during myomectomy and hysterectomy procedures, subsequently entering the bloodstream and spreading to extrauterine sites like the lungs. Barnás et al. suggests that disrupted uterine leiomyoma fragments may also implant on the peritoneum and hypothesize that the advent of laprascopic morcellation may be contributing to this mechanism of pathogenesis. However, a minority of BML cases have been observed in patients that have not had any prior uterine procedures, suggesting that other mechanisms of pathogenesis may occur. Some suggest that these lesions originate from smooth muscle cells in the extrauterine sites themselves. Others propose that BML nodules arise through metaplasia of mesenchymal cells in response to hormonal stimulation.

== Diagnosis ==
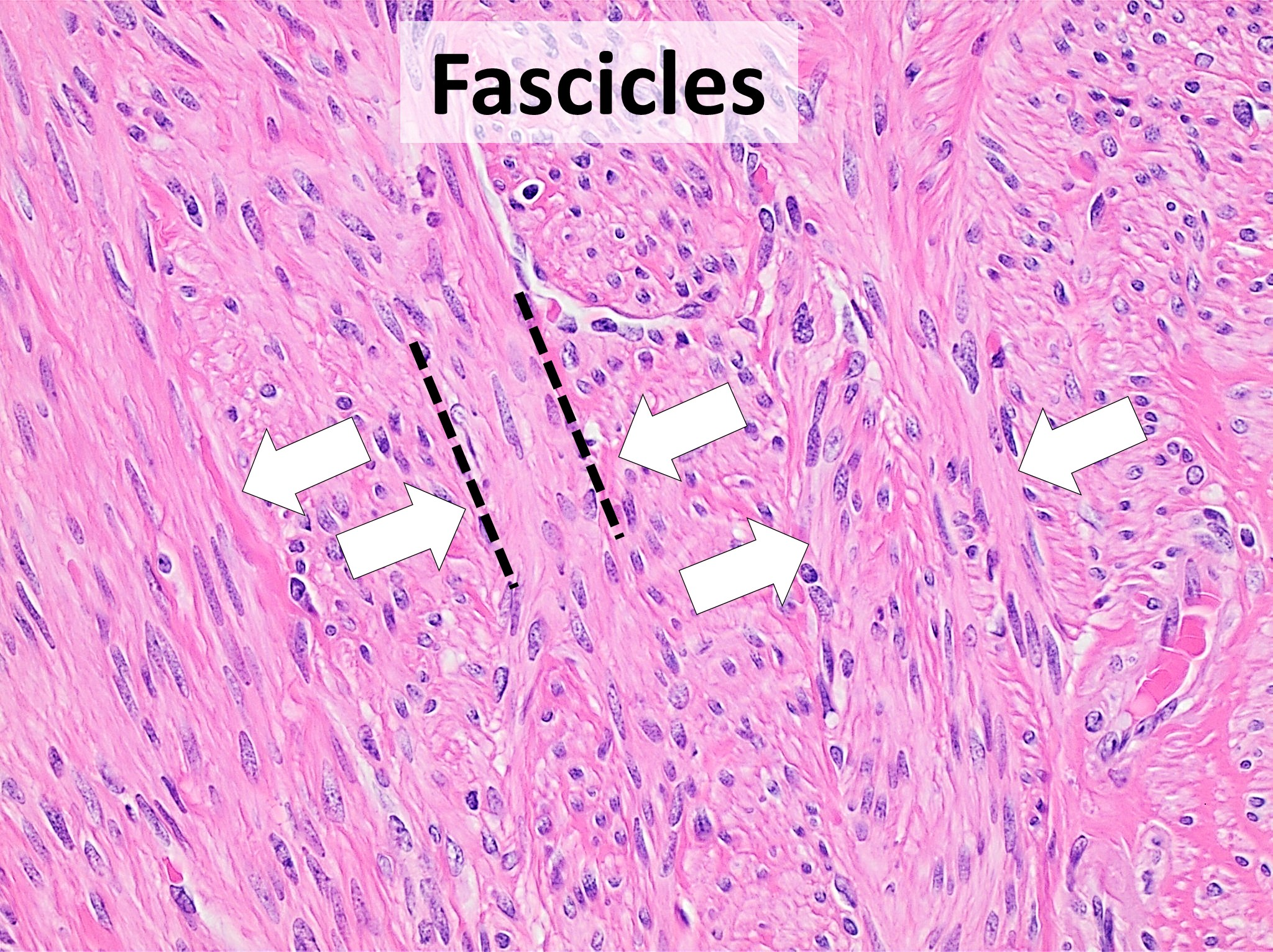
Smooth muscle cells arranged in fascicles

BML lesions are frequently diagnosed incidentally on imaging studies. On CT imaging, they often appear as multiple well-circumscribed solid nodules. Bilateral pulmonary involvement is seen much more frequently than unilateral involvement. PET scan can help differentiate between BML and malignant disease. Little to no uptake is typically seen with BML nodules as compared to high uptake with malignant lesions.

Definitive diagnosis can only be made histologically. BML nodules are composed of well-differentiated spindle cells (smooth muscle cells) arranged in fascicles. These cells typically express actin, desmin, vimentin, and caldesmon, proteins that are characteristically expressed in smooth muscle. BML cells are only mildly proliferative and thus exhibit slow growth and do not usually display atypia. Additionally, these cells are usually positive for estrogen and progesterone receptors, supporting the hypothesis that they originated from uterine tissue.

== Treatment ==
There is no standardized treatment for BML lesions due to variability in location of nodules and associated symptoms. In healthy, asymptomatic patients, conservative management with serial imaging studies may be appropriate. In patients experiencing obstructive symptoms (i.e. difficulty breathing due to a lung lesion), surgical resection is indicated. BML lesions are typically responsive to estrogen deprivation which can be achieved through bilateral oophorectomy or medications including GnRH agonists, selective estrogen receptor modulators (i.e. tamoxifen, raloxifene), and aromatase inhibitors (i.e. letrozole). Often multiple of these medications from different classes are combined to achieve a synergistic effect. Progesterone therapy has also been proposed but has shown variable results. In fact, there have been reported cases of progesterone therapy increasing the size of lesions and causing worsening symptoms. Chemotherapy is not thought to be a viable therapeutic option due to the low mitotic activity of BML lesions. Ultimately, the treatment of BML must be individualized based on each patient's specific needs.

== Prognosis ==
The prognosis for patients with BML is favorable. According to Di Giuseppe et al., malignant transformation of BML lesions has only been reported in 4 cases.

== Epidemiology ==
BML is typically seen in premenopausal women, usually with a prior history of uterine leiomyomas. The average age at diagnosis is approximately 47 years old. Prior surgery to resect uterine leiomyomas is thought to increase the risk of BML. However the literature does not suggest differences in risk based on the type of procedure. Patients are diagnosed on average 8.8 years after primary surgery.

== History ==
BML was first described by Paul E. Steiner in 1939 in an article titled Metastasizing Fibroleiomyoma of the Uterus.

== See also ==
- Uterine fibroids
- Intravenous leiomyomatosis
