= Thank God It's Friday =

Thank God It's Friday may refer to:

- TGI Fridays, an American restaurant chain

== Media and music ==
- Thank God It's Friday (film), a 1978 movie about disco culture
  - "Thank God It's Friday" (Love & Kisses song), a 1978 song from the film of the same name
  - Thank God It's Friday (soundtrack), the soundtrack to the film of the same name
- "Thank God It's Friday" (R. Kelly song), a 1996 single by R. Kelly
- "Last Friday Night (T.G.I.F.)", a 2011 single by Katy Perry

== See also ==
- TGIF (disambiguation)
- TFI Friday
- God bless you
