= Uterine fibroid =

Benign smooth-muscle tumors of the uterus

Uterine fibroids
- Other names: Uterine leiomyoma, uterine myoma, myoma, fibromyoma, fibroleiomyoma
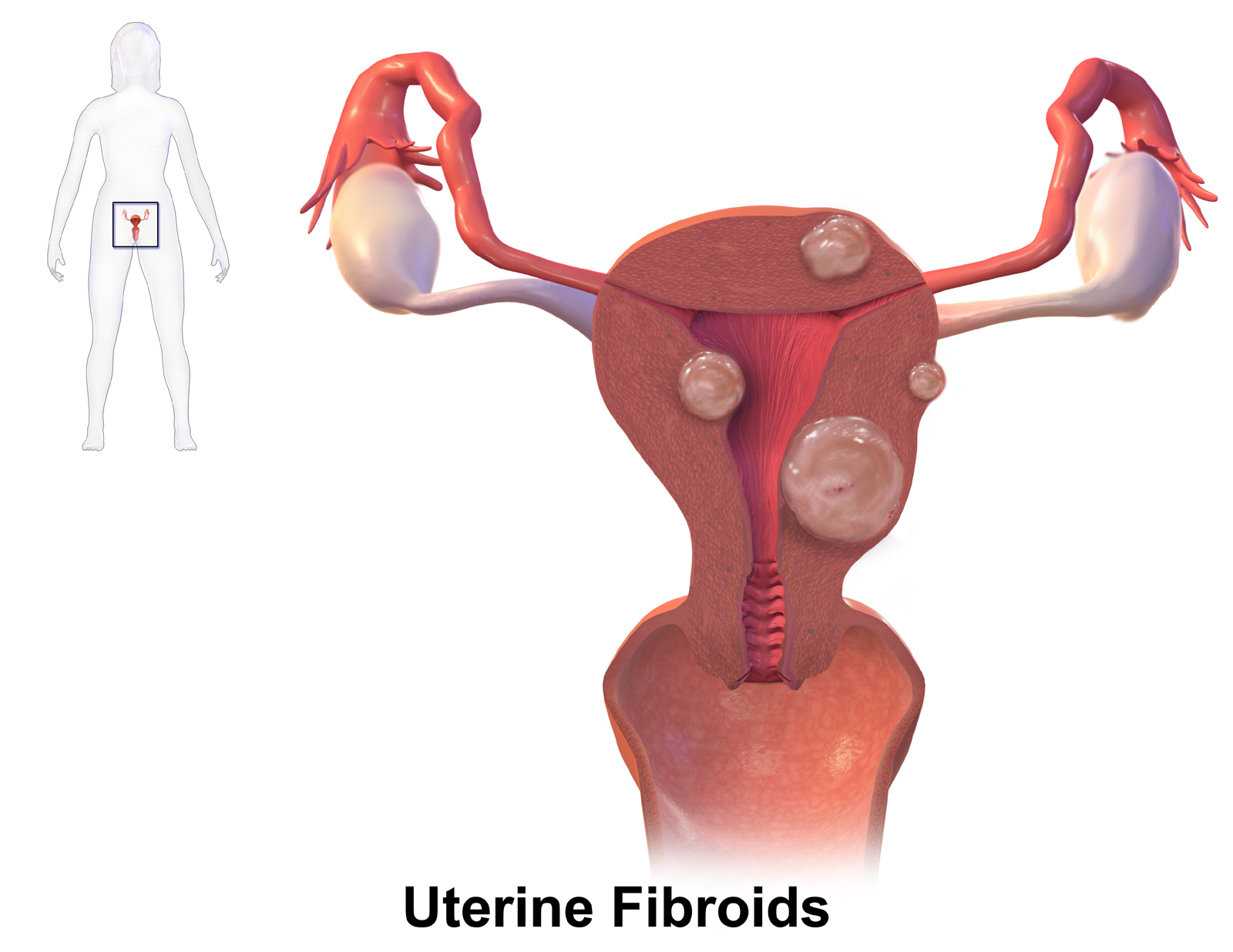
- Medical illustration depicting uterine fibroids.
- Specialty: Gynecology, interventional radiology
- Symptoms: Painful or heavy periods
- Complications: Infertility
- Usual onset: Middle and later reproductive years
- Causes: Unknown
- Risk factors: Family history, obesity, eating red meat
- Diagnostic method: Pelvic examination, medical imaging
- Differential diagnosis: Leiomyosarcoma, pregnancy, ovarian cyst, ovarian cancer
- Treatment: Medications, surgery, uterine artery embolization
- Medication: Ibuprofen, paracetamol (acetaminophen), iron supplements, gonadotropin releasing hormone agonist
- Prognosis: Improve after menopause
- Frequency: ~50% of women by age 50

Uterine fibroids, also known as uterine leiomyomas, fibromyoma or fibroids, are benign smooth muscle tumors of the uterus, part of the female reproductive system. Most women with fibroids have no symptoms, while others may have painful or heavy menstrual bleeding. If large enough, fibroids may push on the bladder and cause frequent need to urinate. They may also cause pain during penetrative sex or lower back pain. Patients can have one uterine fibroid or many. Fibroids may occasionally cause problems with becoming pregnant, but this is uncommon.

The exact cause of uterine fibroids is unclear. However, fibroids run in families and appear to be partly determined by hormone levels. Risk factors include obesity and eating red meat. Diagnosis can be performed by pelvic examination or medical imaging.

Treatment is typically not needed if there are no symptoms. NSAIDs, such as ibuprofen, and paracetamol (acetaminophen) may help with pain. According to The Mayo Clinic, NSAIDs may help relieve pain tied to fibroids. These medications, however, do not reduce bleeding caused by fibroids as they are not hormonal medicines. Iron supplements may be needed in those with heavy periods. Medications of the gonadotropin-releasing hormone agonist class may decrease the size of the fibroids but are expensive and associated with side effects. If greater symptoms are present, surgery to remove the fibroid or uterus may help. Uterine artery embolization may also help. Cancerous versions of fibroids are very rare and are known as leiomyosarcomas. They do not appear to develop from benign fibroids.

About 20% to 80% of women develop fibroids by the age of 50. In 2013, it was estimated that 171 million women were affected worldwide. They are typically found during the middle and later reproductive years. After menopause, they usually decrease in size. In the United States, uterine fibroids are a common reason for surgical removal of the uterus.

== Signs and symptoms ==
Some women with uterine fibroids do not experience any symptoms. However, abdominal pain, anemia, and heavy or increased bleeding can be signs of fibroids. There may also be pain during sexual intercourse, depending on the location of the fibroid. During pregnancy, fibroids may also be the cause of miscarriage, bleeding, premature labor, or interference with the position of the fetus. A uterine fibroid can cause rectal pressure. The abdomen can grow larger, mimicking the appearance of pregnancy. Some large fibroids can extend out through the cervix and vagina.

While fibroids are common, they are not a typical cause for infertility, accounting for about 3% of reasons why a woman may not be able to have a child. The majority of women with uterine fibroids will have normal pregnancy outcomes. In cases of intercurrent uterine fibroids in infertility, a fibroid is typically located in a submucosal position. It is thought that this location may interfere with the function of the lining and the ability of the embryo to implant.

== Risk factors ==
Some risk factors associated with the development of uterine fibroids are modifiable. Fibroids are more common in obese women. Fibroids are dependent on estrogen and progesterone to grow and therefore are most relevant during the reproductive years.

=== Diet ===
Diets high in fruits and vegetables tend to lower the risk of developing fibroids. Fibers, vitamin A, C, and E, phytoestrogens, carotenoids, meat, fish, and dairy products are of unclear effect. Normal dietary levels of vitamin D may reduce the risk of developing fibroids.

=== Genetics ===
Fifty percent of uterine fibroids demonstrate a genetic abnormality. Often, a translocation is found on some chromosomes. Only a few specific genes or cytogenetic deviations are associated with fibroids. 80–85% of fibroids have a mutation in the mediator complex subunit 12 (MED12) gene.

Fibroids are partly genetic. If a mother has fibroids, the risk in the daughter is about three times higher than average.

A 2016 study of patients globally found black women are more likely than white women to develop uterine fibroids, by an estimated 3–9 times higher rate. While African ancestry remains strongly associated with fibroids, newer data from 2025 suggest substantial fibroid burden among several Asian populations as well and women of African descent developing fibroids at younger ages which may result in higher diagnosis rates. Researchers are cautious about interpreting observed racial differences as purely biological because genetics, environment, reproductive factors, healthcare access, medical practices can all contribute to the prevalence and diagnosis of fibroids, and present data may overlook asymptomatic and undiagnosed fibroids.

=== Familial leiomyomata ===
A syndrome (Reed's syndrome) that causes uterine leiomyomata along with cutaneous leiomyomata and renal cell cancer has been reported. This is associated with a mutation in the gene that produces the enzyme fumarate hydratase, located on the long arm of chromosome 1 (1q42.3-43). Inheritance is autosomal dominant.

== Pathophysiology ==
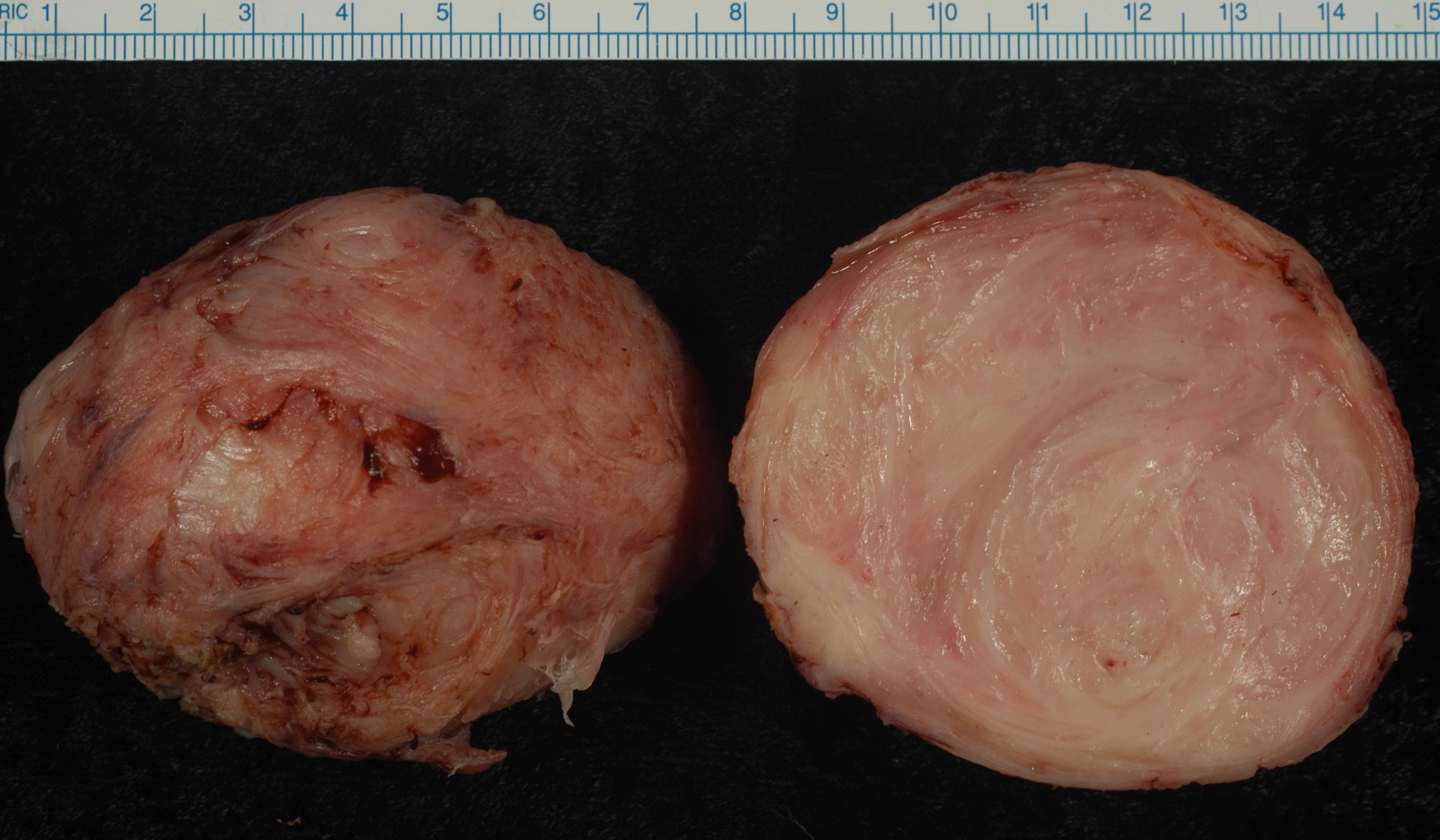
An enucleated uterine leiomyoma – external surface on left, cut surface on right

Uterine fibroids are leiomyomas that occur in the uterus. Fibroids grossly appear as round, well-circumscribed (but not encapsulated), solid nodules that are white or tan and show a whorled appearance on histological section. The size varies, from microscopic to lesions of considerable size. Typically, lesions the size of a grapefruit or bigger are felt by the patient herself through the abdominal wall.

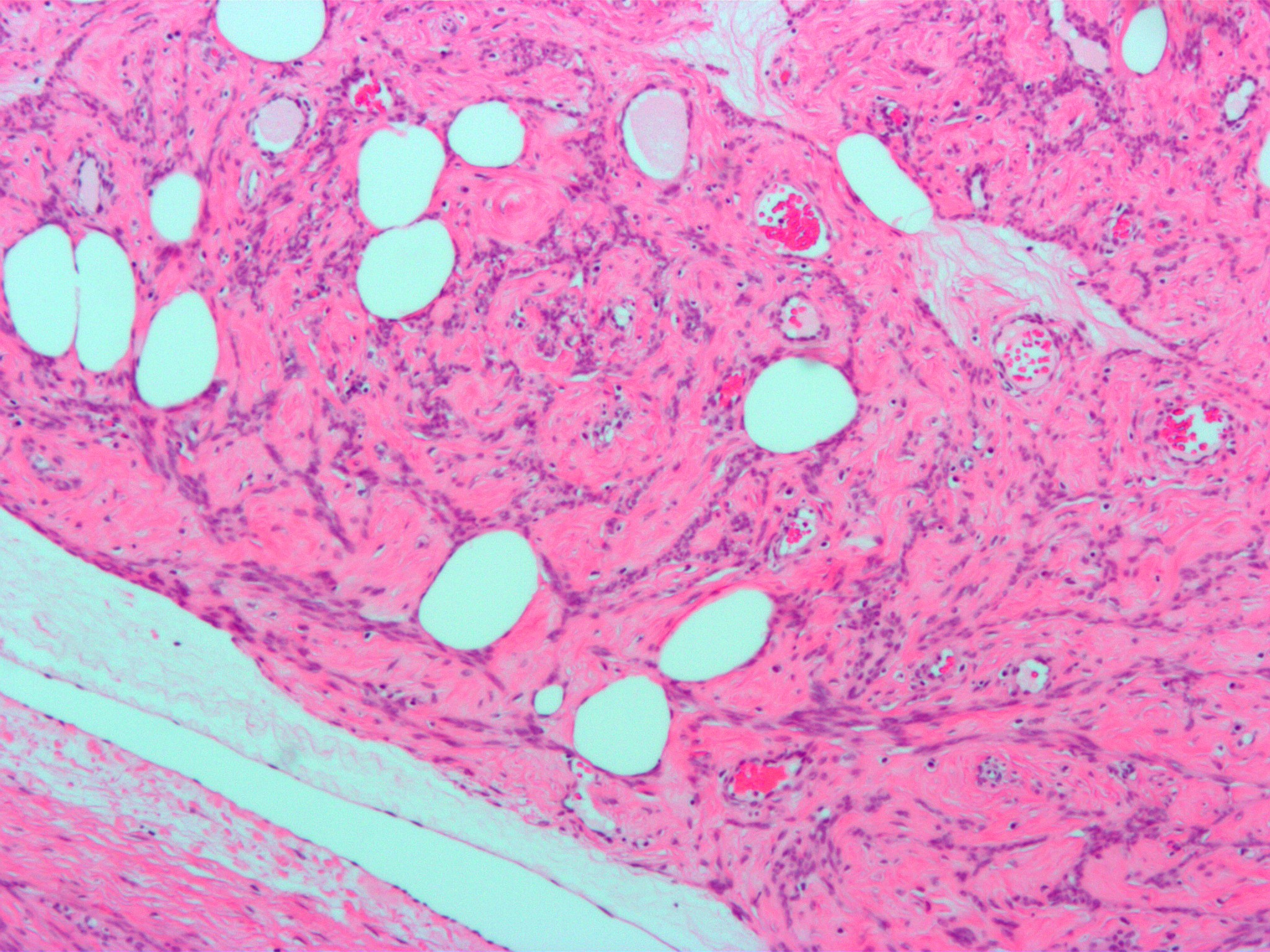
Micrograph of a lipoleiomyoma, a type of leiomyoma. H&E stain.

Microscopically, tumor cells resemble normal cells (elongated, spindle-shaped, with a cigar-shaped nucleus) and form bundles with different directions (whorled). These cells are uniform in size and shape, with scarce mitoses. There are three benign variants: bizarre (atypical), cellular, and mitotically active.

The appearance of prominent nucleoli with peri-nucleolar halos should alert the pathologist to investigate the possibility of the extremely rare hereditary leiomyomatosis and renal cell cancer (Reed) syndrome.

=== Location and classification ===
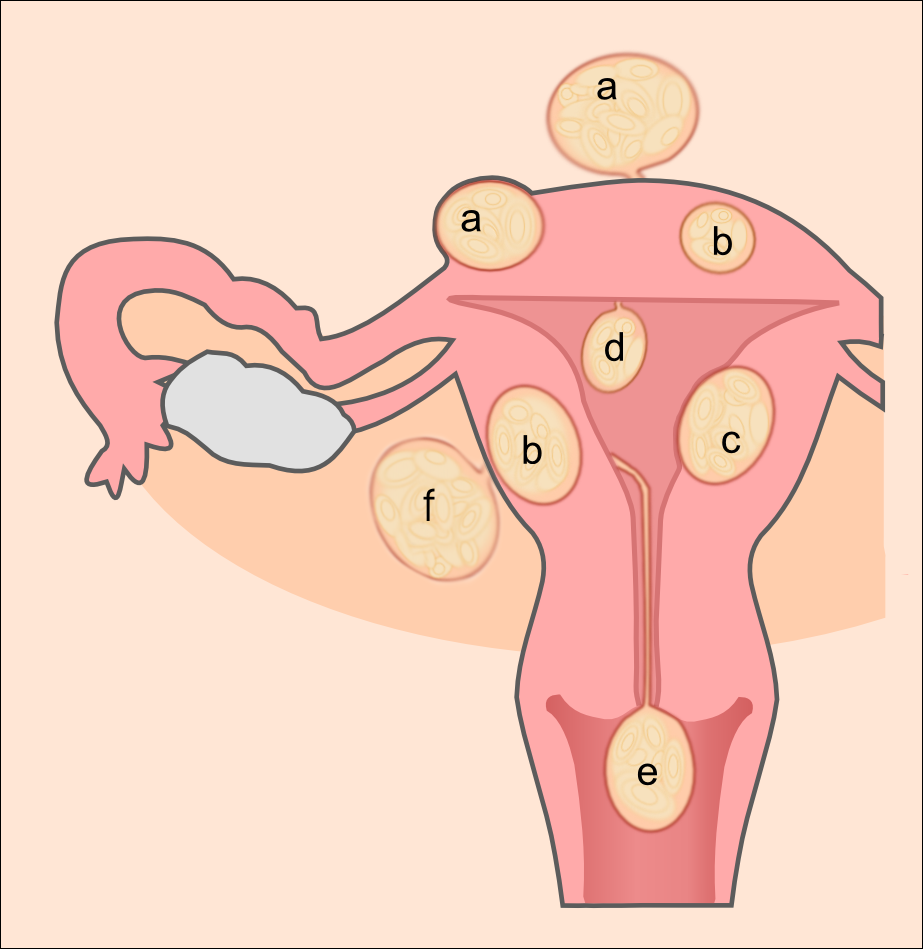
Schematic drawing of various types of uterine fibroids: a=subserosal fibroids, b=intramural fibroids, c=submucosal fibroid, d=pedunculated submucosal fibroid, e=cervical fibroid, f=fibroid of the broad ligament

Growth and location are the main factors that determine whether a fibroid causes symptoms and problems. A small lesion can be symptomatic if located within the uterine cavity, while a large lesion on the outside of the uterus may go unnoticed. Different locations are classified as follows:

- Intramural fibroids are located within the muscular wall of the uterus and are the most common type. Unless they are large, they may be asymptomatic. Intramural fibroids begin as small nodules in the muscular wall of the uterus. With time, intramural fibroids may expand inwards, causing distortion and elongation of the uterine cavity.
- Subserosal fibroids are located on the surface of the uterus. They can also grow outward from the surface and remain attached by a small piece of tissue. They are called pedunculated fibroids.
- Submucosal fibroids are located in the muscle beneath the endometrium of the uterus and distort the uterine cavity; even small lesions in this location may lead to bleeding and infertility. A pedunculated lesion within the cavity is termed an intracavitary fibroid and can be passed through the cervix.
- Cervical fibroids are located in the wall of the cervix (neck of the uterus). Rarely, fibroids are found in the supporting structures (round ligament, broad ligament, or uterosacral ligament) of the uterus that also contain smooth muscle tissue.

Since 2011, the FIGO has published its consensus paper on the classification of fibroids, namely from 0 to 8. This is part of the PALM COEIN classification and is the most frequently used in clinical practise and research.

- Type 0: pedunculated submucosal, intracavitary (i.e., inside of the uterus)
- Type 1: submucosal, <50% intramural
- Type 2: submucosal, ≥50% intramural
- Type 3: contacts the endometrium, 100% intramural
- Type 4: intramural (i.e., completely inside the wall of the uterus)
- Type 5: subserosal, ≥50% intramural
- Type 6: subserosal, <50% intramural
- Type 7: pedunculated subserosal
- Type 8: other (e.g., cervical, parasitic)

There are also hybrid leiomyomas, such as types 2-5, which are both subserosal and submucosal.

Fibroids may be single or multiple. Most fibroids start in the muscular wall of the uterus. With further growth, some lesions may develop towards the outside of the uterus or towards the internal cavity. Secondary changes that may develop within fibroids are hemorrhage, necrosis, calcification, and cystic changes. They tend to calcify after menopause.

If the uterus contains too many to count, it is referred to as diffuse uterine leiomyomatosis.

==== Extrauterine fibroids of uterine origin, metastatic fibroids ====
Fibroids of uterine origin located in other parts of the body, sometimes also called parasitic myomas, have been historically extremely rare, but are now diagnosed with increasing frequency. They may be related or identical to metastasizing leiomyoma.

They are, in most cases, still hormone-dependent but may cause life-threatening complications when they appear in distant organs. Some sources suggest that a substantial share of the cases may be late complications of surgeries such as myomectomy or hysterectomy. Particularly, laparoscopic myomectomy using a morcellator has been associated with an increased risk of this complication.

There are several rare conditions in which fibroids metastasize. They still grow benignly, but can be dangerous depending on their location.

- In leiomyoma with vascular invasion, an ordinary-appearing fibroid invades into a vessel, but there is no risk of recurrence.
- In intravenous leiomyomatosis, leiomyomata grow in veins with uterine fibroids as their source. Cardiac (heart) involvement can be fatal.
- In benign metastasizing leiomyoma, leiomyomata grow in more distant sites such as the lungs and lymph nodes. The source is not entirely clear. Pulmonary involvement can be fatal.
- In disseminated intraperitoneal leiomyomatosis, leiomyomata grow diffusely on the peritoneal and omental surfaces, with uterine fibroids as their source. This can simulate a malignant tumor but behaves benignly.

=== Pathogenesis ===
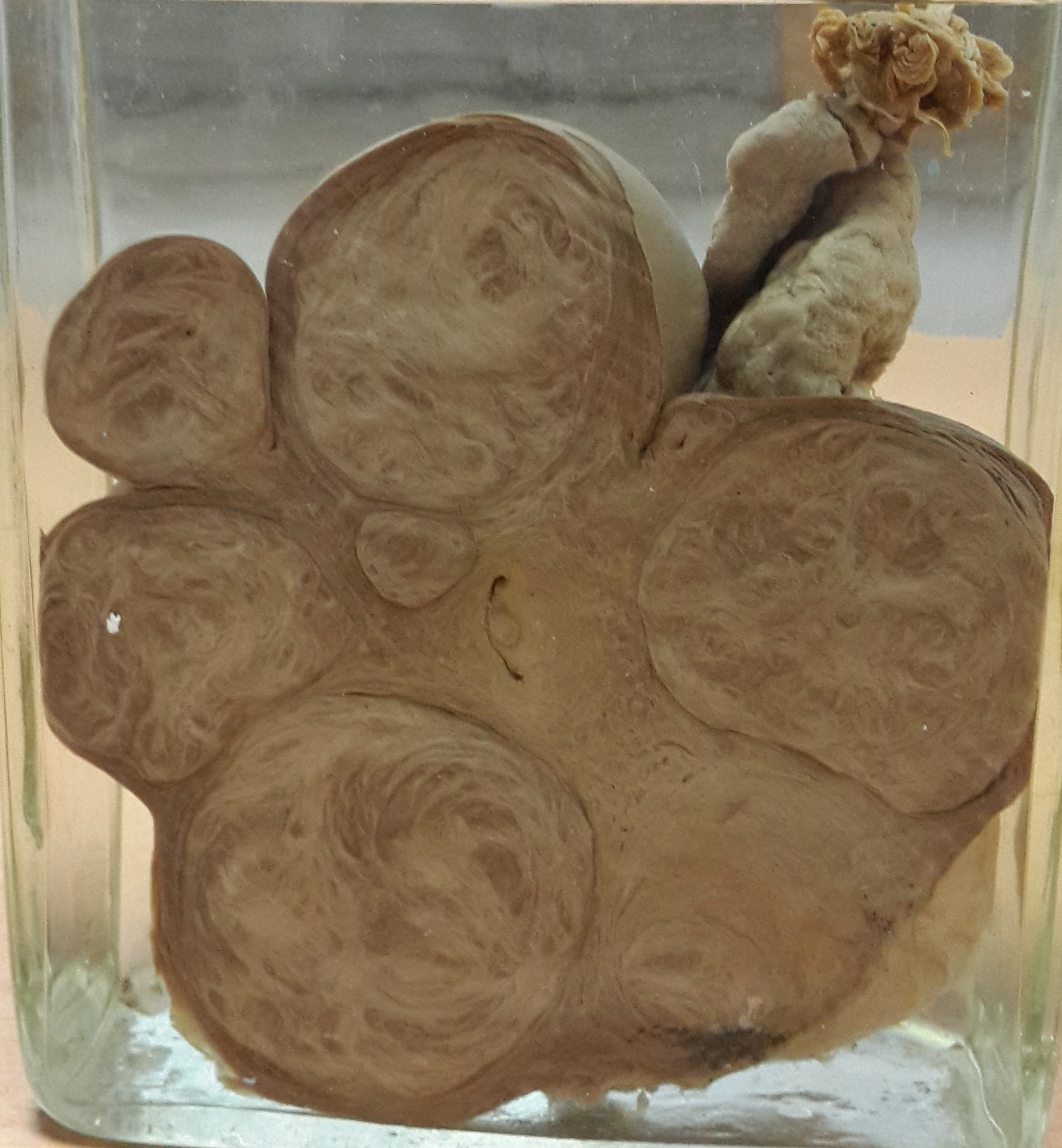
Multiple uterine leiomyoma

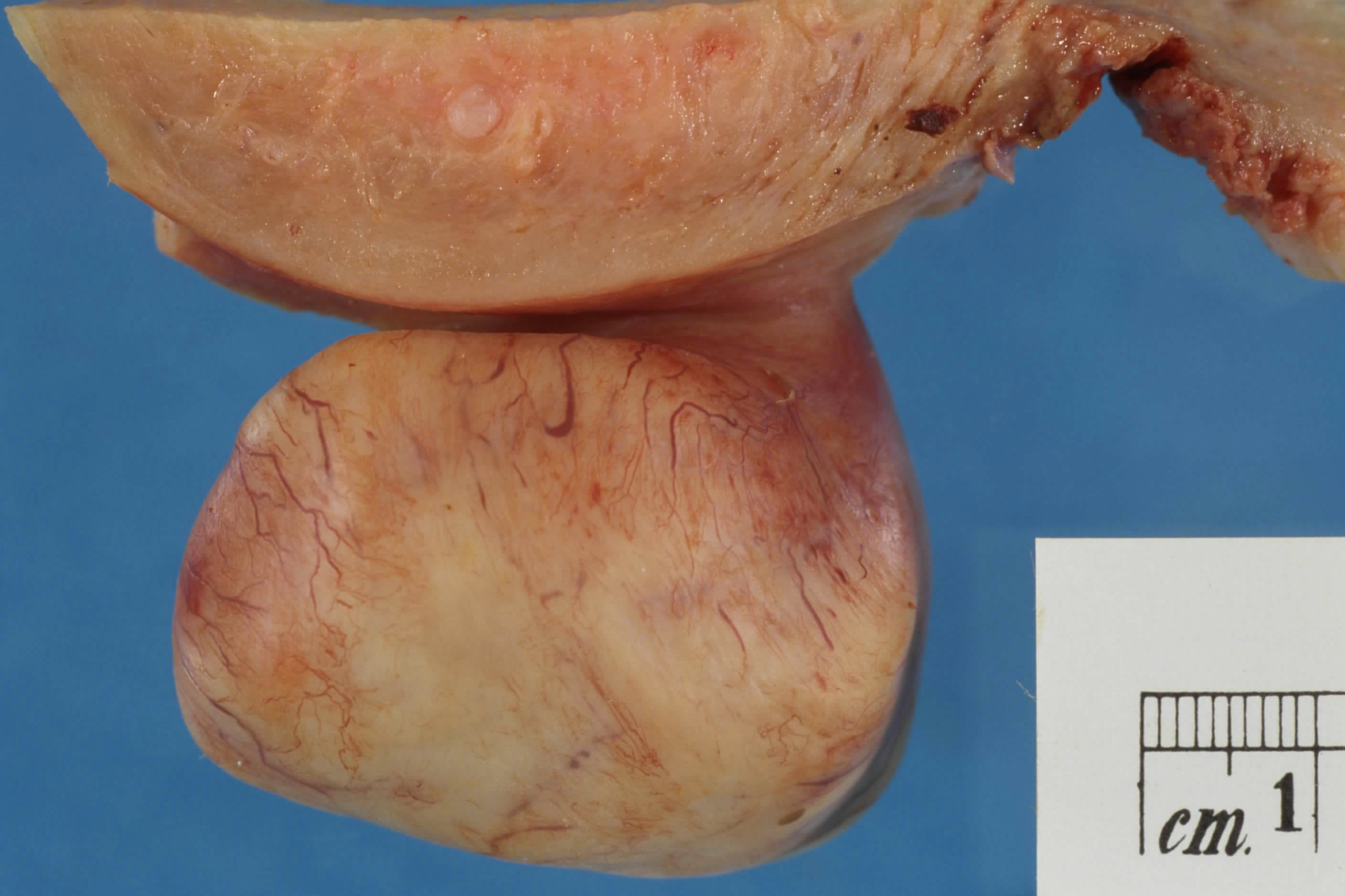
Sub-serosal uterine fibroid

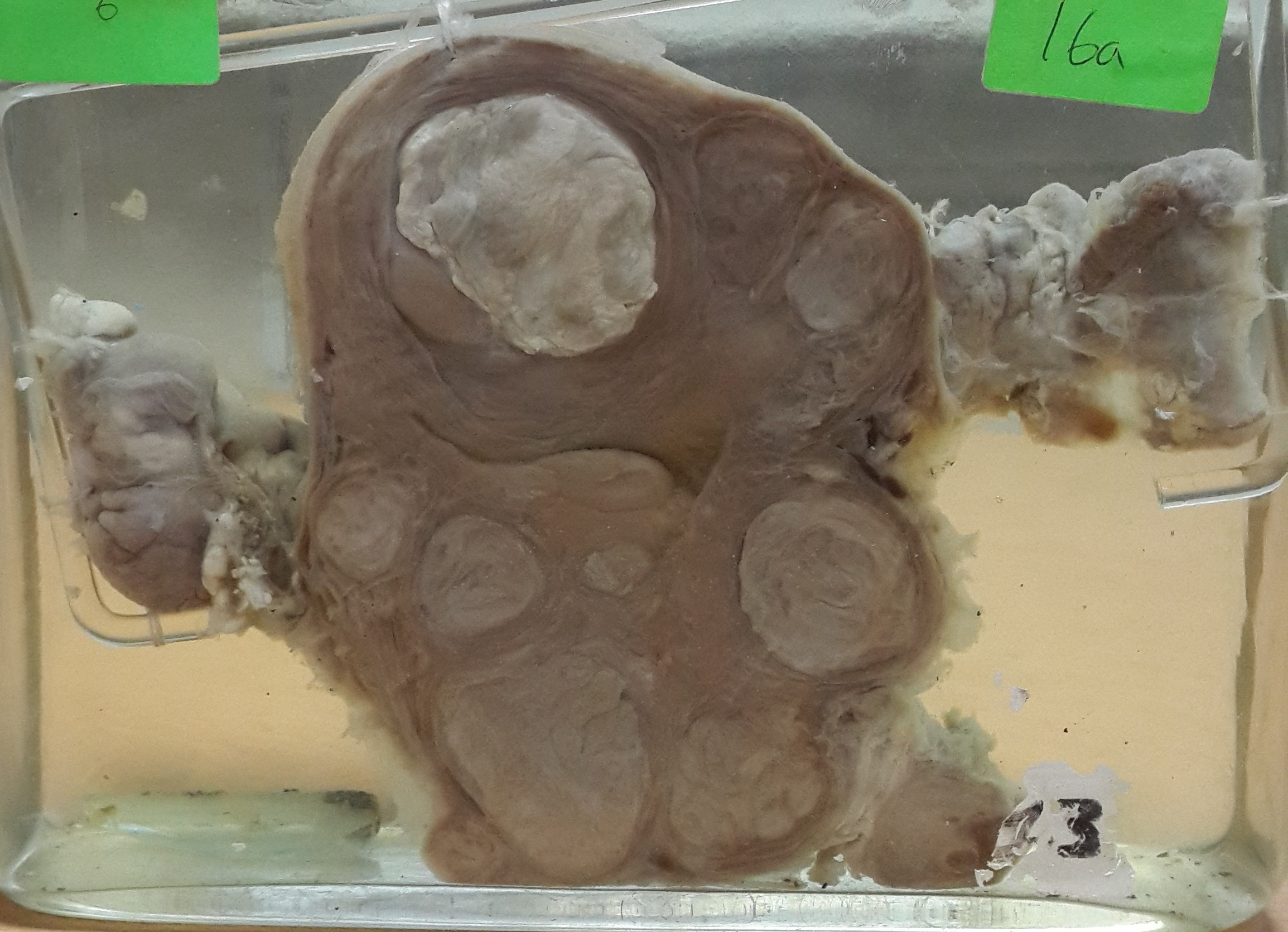
Multiple uterine leiomyoma with calcification

Fibroids are monoclonal tumors and approximately 40–50% show karyotypically detectable chromosomal abnormalities. When multiple fibroids are present, they frequently have unrelated genetic defects. Specific mutations of the MED12 protein have been noted in 70 percent of fibroids.

The exact cause of fibroids is not understood. However, the current working hypothesis is that genetic predispositions, prenatal hormone exposure, and the effects of hormones, growth factors, and xenoestrogens cause fibroid growth. Known risk factors are African descent, obesity, polyendocrine metabolic ovarian syndrome (PMOS), diabetes, hypertension, and never having given birth.

It is believed that estrogen and progesterone have a mitogenic effect on leiomyoma cells and also act by influencing (directly and indirectly) a large number of growth factors, cytokines, and apoptotic factors, as well as other hormones. Furthermore, the actions of estrogen and progesterone are modulated by the cross-talk between estrogen, progesterone, and prolactin signaling, which controls the expression of the respective nuclear receptors. It is believed that estrogen promotes growth by up-regulating IGF-1, EGFR, TGF-beta1, TGF-beta3 and PDGF, and promotes aberrant survival of leiomyoma cells by down-regulating p53, increasing expression of the anti-apoptotic factor PCP4 and antagonizing PPAR-gamma signaling. Progesterone is thought to promote the growth of leiomyoma through up-regulating EGF, TGF-beta1, and TGF-beta3, and promotes survival through up-regulating Bcl-2 expression and down-regulating TNF-alpha. Progesterone is believed to counteract growth by downregulating IGF-1. Expression of transforming growth interacting factor (TGIF) is increased in leiomyoma compared with myometrium. TGIF is a potential repressor of TGF-β pathways in myometrial cells.

Aromatase and 17beta-hydroxysteroid dehydrogenase are aberrantly expressed in fibroids, indicating that fibroids can convert circulating androstenedione into estradiol. Similar mechanism of action has been elucidated in endometriosis and other endometrial diseases. Aromatase inhibitors are currently considered for treatment, at certain doses they would completely inhibit estrogen production in the fibroid while not largely affecting ovarian production of estrogen (and thus systemic levels of it). Aromatase overexpression is particularly pronounced in African-American women.

Genetic and hereditary causes are suspected, and several epidemiologic findings indicate considerable genetic influence, especially for early-onset cases. First-degree relatives have a 2.5-fold risk and nearly a 6-fold risk when considering early-onset cases. Monozygotic twins have double concordance rate for hysterectomy compared to dizygotic twins.

Expansion of uterine fibroids occurs at a slow rate of cell proliferation combined with the production of copious amounts of extracellular matrix.

A small population of the cells in a uterine fibroid has properties of stem cells or progenitor cells, and contributes significantly to ovarian steroid-dependent growth of fibroids. These stem-progenitor cells are deficient in estrogen receptor α and progesterone receptor and instead rely on substantially higher levels of these receptors in surrounding differentiated cells to mediate estrogen and progesterone actions via paracrine signaling.

== Diagnosis ==
Physical examination and ultrasound are sufficient for diagnosing uterine fibroids in most cases. When ultrasound findings are inconclusive, magnetic resonance imaging (MRI) can confirm the diagnosis of uterine fibroids in most cases. In addition, MRI can identify benign uterine fibroids with atypical imaging features and fibroids with variant growth patterns. MRI can also identify other uterine (e.g., adenomyosis, endometrial polyps, endometrial cancer) and extrauterine (e.g., benign and malignant ovarian tumors, endometriosis) disorders that may mimic the appearance of uterine fibroids and/or contribute to the patient's symptoms. However, a small proportion of uterine fibroids can mimic other malignant uterine tumors (e.g. leiomyosarcoma) on all available imaging modalities (e.g. ultrasound, CT, MRI and PET-CT).

Malignant tumors of the uterine wall (e.g., leiomyosarcoma) are very rare. Findings suggestive of a malignant uterine tumor rather than a benign fibroid include fast or unexpected growth (particularly after menopause), interruption/effacement of the endometrial stripe, lymph node enlargement, invasion of adjacent organs, and metastases to distant organs (e.g., lung). MRI findings suggestive of a malignancy include nodular/ill-circumscribed tumor margins, intermediate/high T2-weighted signal intensity of the solid tumor components, regions with high signal T1-weighted sequences in keeping with subacute hemorrhage, fine/wispy enhancement of the solid parts of the tumor, and restricted diffusion on diffusion-weighted imaging (DWI). A biopsy is rarely performed and if performed, is rarely diagnostic. Should there be an uncertain diagnosis after ultrasounds and MRI imaging, surgery is generally indicated.

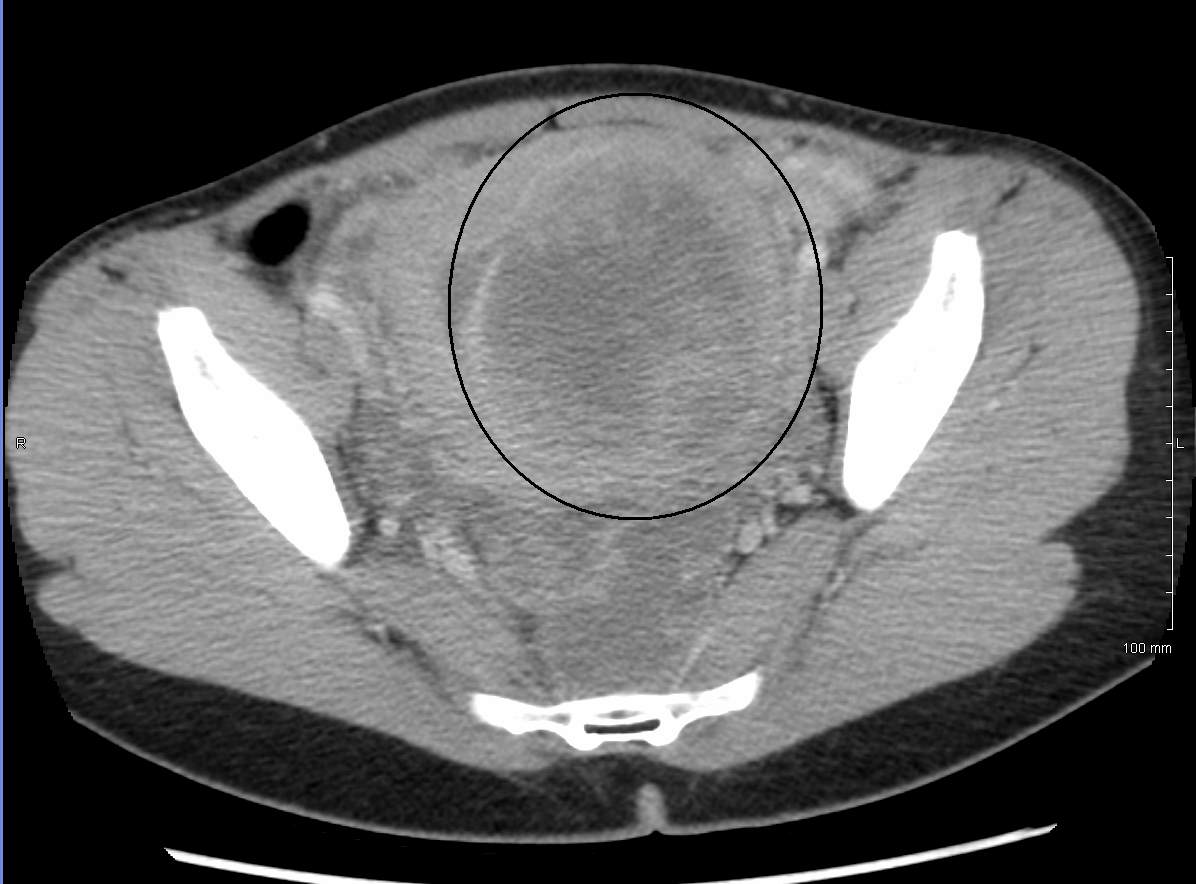
A very large (9 cm) fibroid of the uterus which is causing pelvic congestion syndrome as seen on CT

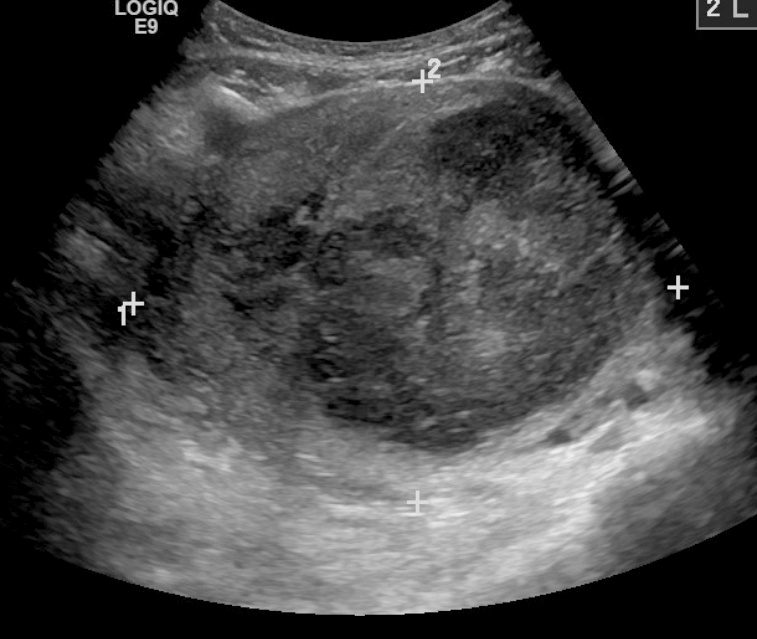
A very large (9 cm) fibroid of the uterus, which is causing pelvic congestion syndrome as seen on ultrasound

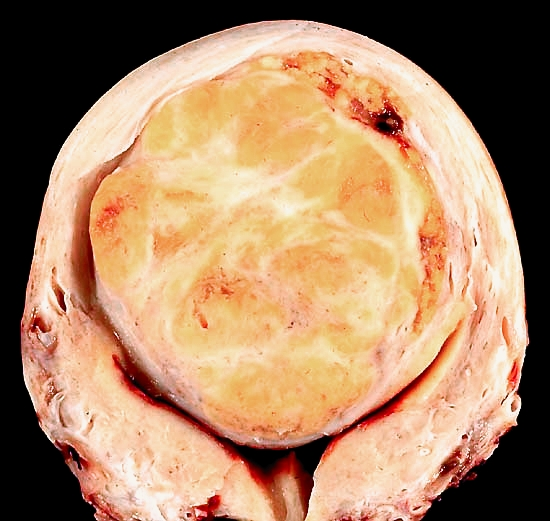
A relatively large submucosal leiomyoma; it fills out the major part of the endometrial cavity.

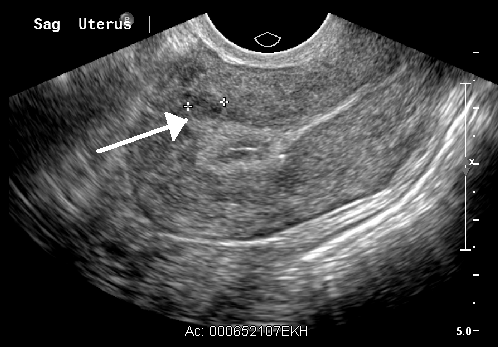
A small uterine fibroid seen within the wall of the myometrium on a cross-sectional ultrasound view

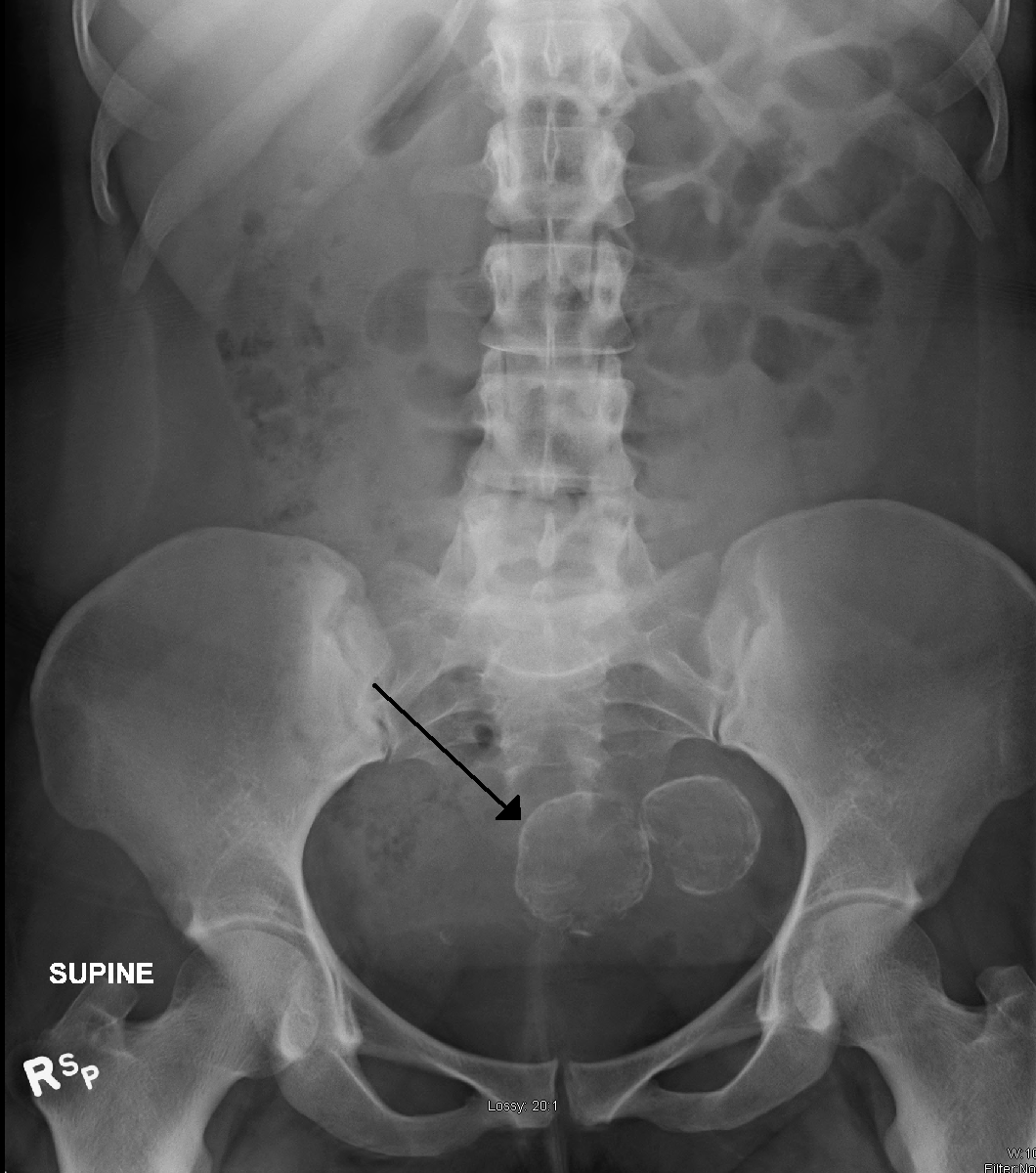
Two calcified fibroids (in the uterus)

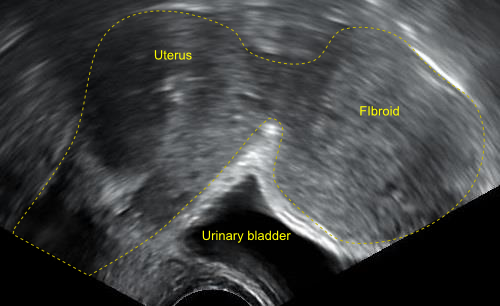
A subserosal uterine fibroid with a diameter of 5 centimeters

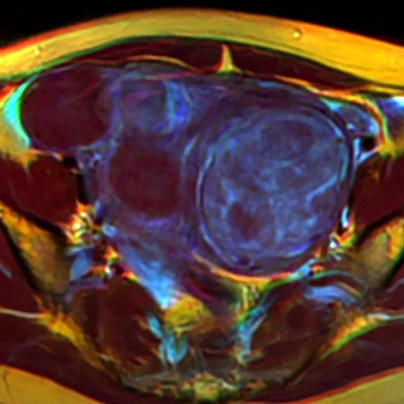
MRI image with multiple uterine leiomyomas

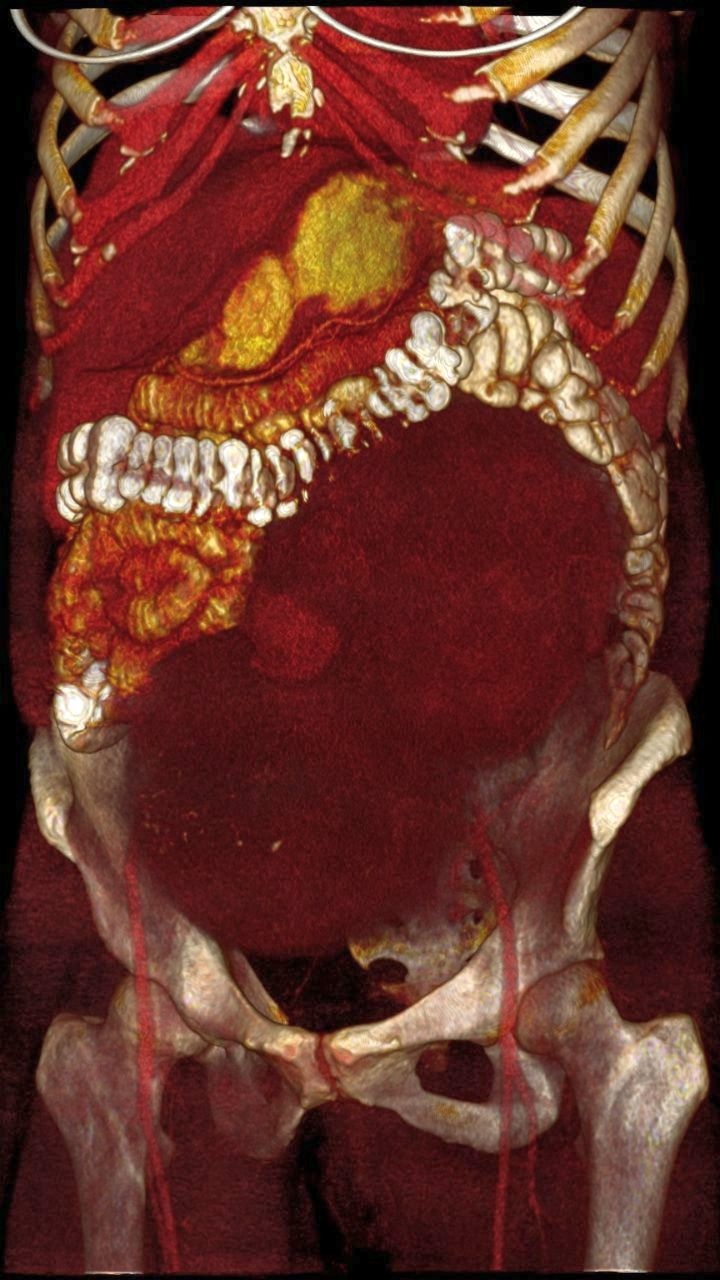
Giant leiomyomas almost filling the abdomen

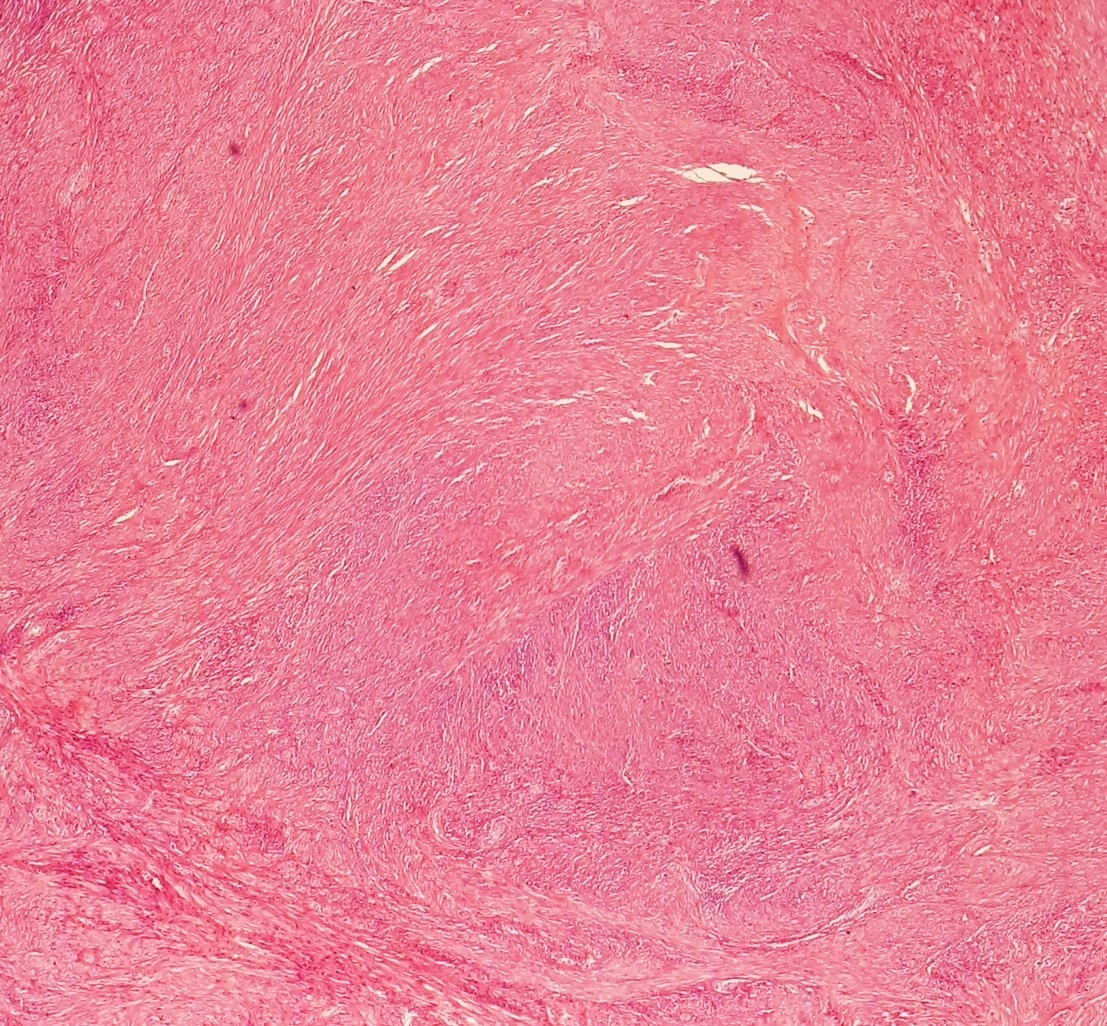
Histopathology of uterine fibroids typically show smooth muscle in a whorled (fascicular) pattern.

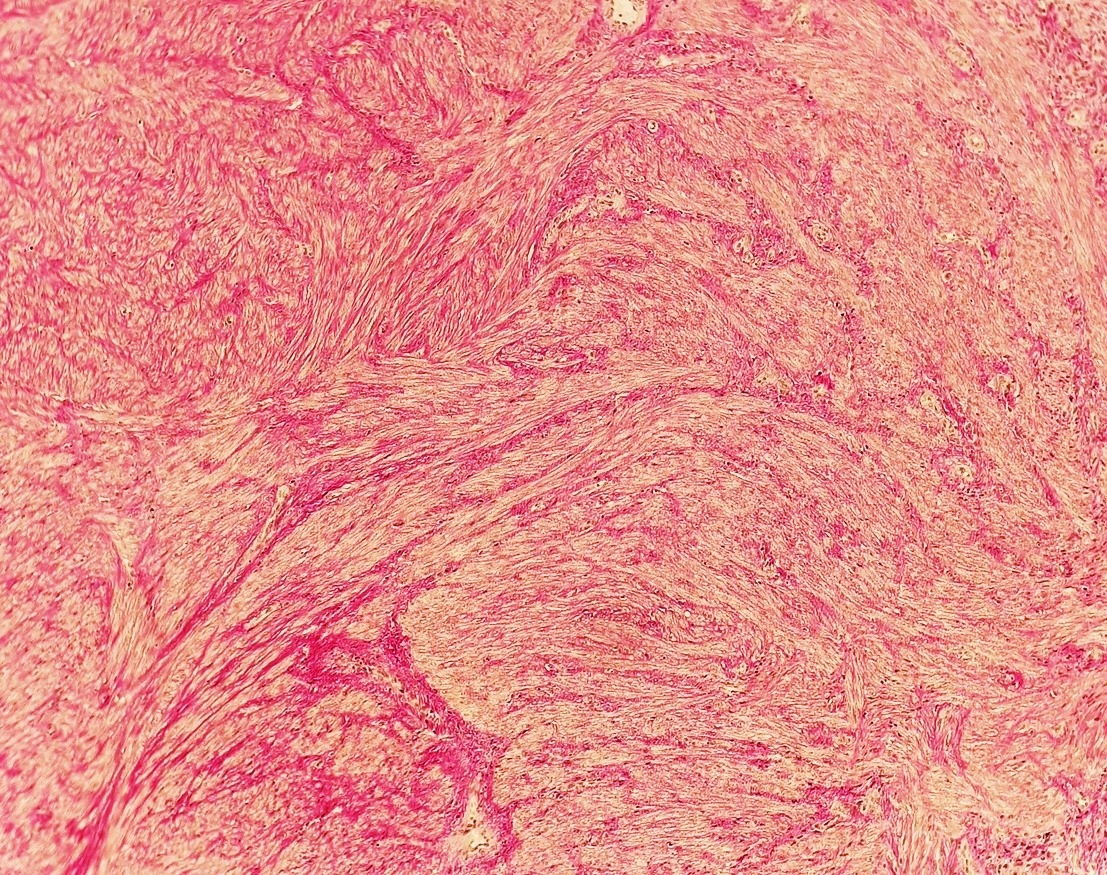
This variant of Van Gieson's stain distinguishes muscle (yellow) from connective tissue (red).

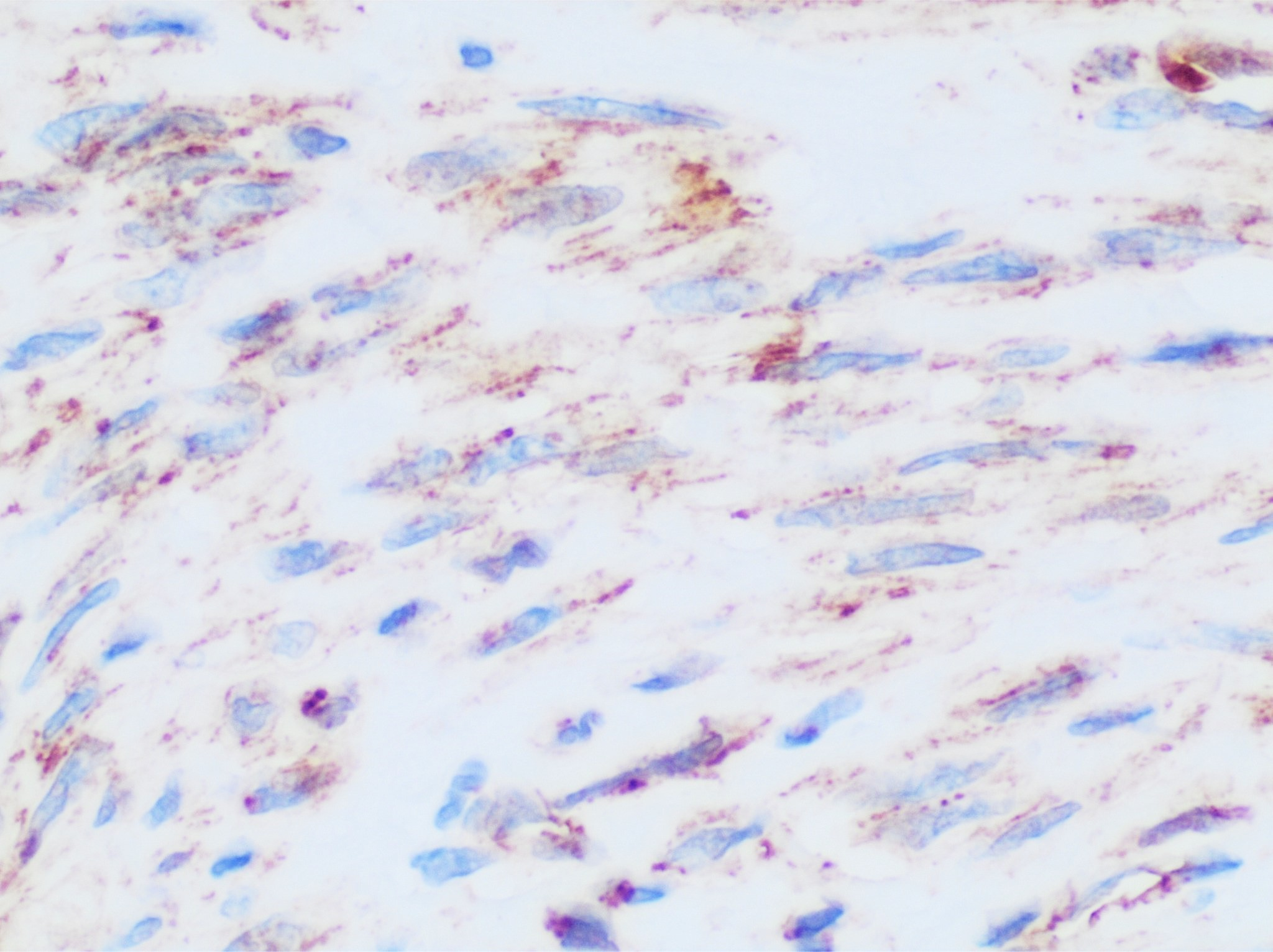
Immunohistochemistry for β-catenin in uterine leiomyoma, which is negative as there is only staining of cytoplasm but not of cell nuclei.

Negative immunohistochemistry staining for β-catenin in cell nuclei is a consistent finding in uterine leiomyomas, and helps distinguish such tumors from β-catenin-positive spindle cell tumors.

=== Coexisting disorders ===
Fibroids that lead to heavy vaginal bleeding lead to anemia and iron deficiency. Due to pressure effects, gastrointestinal problems such as constipation and bloatedness are possible. Compression of the ureter may lead to hydronephrosis. Fibroids may also present alongside endometriosis, which itself may cause infertility. Adenomyosis may be mistaken for or coexist with fibroids.

In very rare cases, malignant (cancerous) growths, leiomyosarcoma, of the myometrium can develop. In extremely rare cases uterine fibroids may present as part or early symptom of the hereditary leiomyomatosis and renal cell cancer syndrome.

== Treatment ==
Most fibroids do not require treatment unless they are causing symptoms. After menopause, fibroids shrink and usually do not cause problems.

Uterine fibroids that cause symptoms can be treated by:

- medication to control symptoms (i.e., symptomatic management)
- medication aimed at shrinking tumors
- ultrasound fibroid destruction
- surgical removal of fibroids (myomectomy) or using heat to reduce size (radiofrequency ablation)
- surgical removal of the womb (hysterectomy)
- blocking the blood supply of fibroids (uterine artery embolization)

In those who have symptoms, uterine artery embolization and surgical options have similar outcomes with respect to satisfaction.

For decades, a common approach to treating symptomatic fibroids was "either get a hysterectomy or wait until menopause diminishes the symptoms," but minimally invasive (small incision) and noninvasive (no incision) options were often not offered. Especially since the 2010s, minimally invasive and noninvasive options are increasingly being offered as they have advanced on their technological journey from being new and unusual to being common clinical practice.

=== Medication ===
Several medications may be used to control symptoms. Painkillers (NSAIDs) can be used to reduce painful menstrual periods. Oral contraceptive pills may be prescribed to reduce uterine bleeding and cramps. Anemia may be treated with iron supplementation.

Levonorgestrel intrauterine devices are effective in limiting menstrual blood flow and improving other symptoms. Side effects are typically few as the levonorgestrel (a progestin) is released in low concentration locally. While most levonorgestrel-IUD studies concentrated on the treatment of women without fibroids, a few reported good results specifically for women with fibroids, including a substantial regression of fibroids.

Cabergoline, when given in a moderate and well-tolerated dose, has been shown in two studies to shrink fibroids effectively. The mechanism of action of how it shrinks fibroids is unclear.

Ulipristal acetate is a synthetic selective progesterone receptor modulator (SPRM) that has tentative evidence to support its use for presurgical treatment of fibroids with low side-effects. Long-term UPA-treated fibroids have shown volume reduction of about 70%. In some cases UPA alone is used to relieve symptoms without surgery, and to allow successful pregnancies without fibroid regrowth. Indeed, in the tumor cells, the molecule blocks the cell proliferation, induces their apoptosis and stimulates the remodeling of the extensive fibrosis by matrix metalloproteinases, hence explaining the long-term benefit. Yet, due to some rare but severe hepatic injuries after UPA treatment, the licence was suspended in 2020 in the EU and voluntarily removed in Canada.

Danazol is an effective treatment for fibroids and controls symptoms. Unpleasant side effects limit its use. The mechanism of action is thought to be antiestrogenic effects. Recent experience indicates that the safety and side effect profile can be improved by more cautious dosing.

Gonadotropin-releasing hormone analogs cause temporary regression of fibroids by decreasing estrogen levels. Because of the limitations and side effects of this medication, it is rarely recommended other than for preoperative use to shrink the size of the fibroids and uterus before surgery. It is typically used for a maximum of six months or less because after longer use, they could cause osteoporosis and other typically postmenopausal complications. The main side effects are transient postmenopausal symptoms. In many cases, the fibroids will regrow after treatment cessation; however, significant benefits may persist for much longer in some cases. Several variations are possible, such as GnRH agonists with add-back regimens intended to decrease the adverse effects of estrogen deficiency. Several add-back regimes are possible, tibolone, raloxifene, progestogens alone, estrogen alone, and combined estrogens and progestogens.

Progesterone antagonists such as mifepristone have been tested; there is evidence that they improve some symptoms and quality of life, but because of adverse histological changes observed in several trials, they can not currently be recommended outside of a research setting. Fibroid growth has recurred after antiprogestin treatment was stopped.

Aromatase inhibitors have been used experimentally to reduce fibroids. The effect is believed to be due to lowering systemic estrogen levels and inhibition of locally overexpressed aromatase in fibroids. However, fibroid growth has recurred after treatment was stopped. Experience from experimental aromatase inhibitor treatment of endometriosis indicates that aromatase inhibitors might be particularly useful in combination with a progestogenic ovulation inhibitor.

=== Uterine artery embolization ===
Uterine artery embolization (UAE) is a noninvasive procedure that blocks blood flow to fibroids, causing them to shrink. Long-term outcomes for UAE are comparable to surgery when measured by reports from patients. There is tentative evidence showing traditional surgery may result in better fertility rates. One review found that UAE doubles the future risk of miscarriage. UAE also appears to require more repeat procedures than if surgery was done initially. A person will usually recover from the procedure within a few days.

Uterine artery ligation, sometimes also laparoscopic occlusion of uterine arteries, is a minimally invasive method to limit the blood supply of the uterus by a small surgery that can be performed transvaginally or laparoscopically. The principal mechanism of action may be similar to that in UAE, but it is easier to perform and has fewer expected side effects.

The 2016 NICE (National Institute of Clinical Excellence – the non-governmental public body that publishes guidelines in the use of health technologies and good clinical practice in the United Kingdom) guidelines state UAE/UFE can be offered to women with symptomatic fibroids (fibroids being usually >30mm in size). Patients should be informed that UAE and myomectomy (the surgical removal of fibroids) may potentially allow them to retain their fertility.

=== Myomectomy ===
Myomectomy is a surgery to remove one or more fibroids. It is usually recommended when more conservative treatment options fail for patients who want fertility-preserving surgery or who want to retain the uterus.

There are three types of myomectomy:

- In a hysteroscopic myomectomy (also called transcervical resection), the fibroid can be removed by either the use of a resectoscope, an endoscopic instrument inserted through the vagina and cervix that can use high-frequency electrical energy to cut tissue, or a similar device.
- A laparoscopic myomectomy is done through a small incision near the navel. The physician uses a laparoscope and surgical instruments to remove the fibroids. Studies have suggested that laparoscopic myomectomy is associated with lower morbidity rates and faster recovery than laparotomic myomectomy. In both minimally invasive procedures – hysteroscopy and laparoscopy – laser systems, such as diode lasers, can be used for cutting or ablating tissue. In hysteroscopic outpatient laser applications, it has been reported that the surrounding healthy tissue is relatively spared and intraoperative bleeding can be minimized. Additionally, the structural integrity of the myometrium can be largely preserved. Due to their potentially tissue-sparing properties, laser-based procedures have especially been discussed as a potential way to reduce the risk of scarring or intrauterine adhesions, which could be relevant for patients who wish to preserve their fertility. However, extensive randomized prospective trials are still required to more effectively demonstrate the advantages and disadvantages of these technologies. Hysteroscopic laser procedures can be performed on an outpatient basis under local anesthesia, whereas laparoscopic procedures generally require general anesthesia.
- A laparotomic myomectomy (also known as an open or abdominal myomectomy) is the most invasive surgical procedure to remove fibroids. The physician makes an incision in the abdominal wall and removes the fibroids from the uterus.

Laparoscopic myomectomy has less pain and a shorter time in the hospital than open surgery. An analysis of 15,000 patients found that those who had myomectomy required fewer additional procedures to manage fibroids (including hysterectomies) over the next 5 years than those who had UAE.

=== Hysterectomy ===
Hysterectomy was the classical method of treating fibroids. Although it is now recommended only as a last option, fibroids are still the leading cause of hysterectomies in the US.

=== Endometrial ablation ===
Endometrial ablation can be used if the fibroids are only within the uterus and not intramural and are relatively small. High failure and recurrence rates are expected in the presence of larger or intramural fibroids.

=== Other procedures ===
Radiofrequency ablation is a minimally invasive treatment for fibroids. In this technique the fibroid is shrunk by inserting a needle-like device into the fibroid through the abdomen and heating it with radio-frequency (RF) electrical energy to cause necrosis of cells. The treatment is a potential option for women with fibroids who have completed childbearing, and want to avoid a hysterectomy.

Magnetic resonance guided focused ultrasound is a non-invasive intervention (requiring no incision) that uses high-intensity focused ultrasound waves to destroy tissue and magnetic resonance imaging (MRI), which guides and monitors the treatment. During the procedure, delivery of focused ultrasound energy is guided and controlled using MR thermal imaging. Patients who have symptomatic fibroids, who desire a non-invasive treatment option, and who do not have contraindications for MRI are candidates for MRgFUS. About 60% of patients qualify. It is an outpatient procedure and takes one to three hours, depending on the size of the fibroids. It is safe and about 75% effective. Symptomatic improvement is sustained for two plus years. Need for additional treatment varies from 16 to 20% and is largely dependent on the amount of fibroid that can be safely ablated; the higher the ablated volume, the lower the re-treatment rate. There are currently no randomized trials between MRgFUS and UAE. A multi-center trial is underway to investigate the efficacy of MRgFUS vs. UAE.

== Prognosis ==
About 1 out of 1,000 lesions are or become malignant, typically as a leiomyosarcoma on histology. A sign that a lesion may be malignant is growth after menopause. There is no consensus among pathologists regarding the transformation of leiomyoma into a sarcoma.

=== Metastasis ===
There are rare conditions in which fibroids metastasize, for example, extrauterine fibroids. They still grow benignly, but can be dangerous depending on their location.

=== Pyomyoma ===
Pyomyoma is a pyogenous infection of a preexisting benign uterine fibroid. It is a rare, yet potentially fatal complication. Ultrasound of the pelvis, CT or MRI scan of the pelvis, Septic screen—FBC/CRP, blood cultures, urine cultures, high vaginal swab can be used in diagnosis.

== Epidemiology ==
About 20% to 80% of women develop fibroids by the age of 50. Globally, in 2013, it was estimated that 171 million women were affected. They are typically found during the middle and later reproductive years. After menopause they usually decrease in size. Surgery to remove uterine fibroids occurs more frequently in women in "higher social classes". Adolescents develop uterine fibroids much less frequently than older women. Up to 50% of women with uterine fibroids have no symptoms. The prevalence of uterine fibroids among teenagers is 0.4%.

=== Europe ===
The incidence of uterine fibroids in Europe is thought to be lower than the incidence in the US.

=== United States ===
Eighty percent of African American women will develop benign uterine fibroid tumors by their late 40s, according to the National Institute of Environmental Health Sciences. African American women are two to three times more likely to be diagnosed with fibroids than Caucasian women. In African American women, fibroids seem to occur at a younger age, grow more quickly, and are more likely to cause symptoms. These complications lead to higher rates of surgery for African Americans, both myomectomy, and hysterectomy. Increased risk of fibroids in African Americans causes them to fare worse in in-vitro fertility treatments and raises their risk of premature births and delivery by Caesarean section.

It is unclear why fibroids are more commonly diagnosed in African-American women. Some studies suggest that black women who have obesity and high blood pressure are more likely to have fibroids. Other suggested causes include the tendency of African American women to consume food with less than the daily requirements for vitamin D. Another possibility is fibroids are more likely to cause negative symptoms in black women, while other groups have higher rates of asymptomatic fibroids that never need medical intervention.

== Related legislation ==
=== United States ===
The 2005 S.1289 bill was read twice and referred to the committee on Health, Labor, and Pensions but never passed for a Senate or House vote; the proposed Uterine Fibroid Research and Education Act of 2005 mentioned that $5 billion is spent annually on hysterectomy surgeries each year, which affect 22% of African Americans and 7% of Caucasian women. The bill also called for additional funding for research and educational purposes. It also states that of the $28 billion issued to NIH, $5 million was allocated for uterine fibroids in 2004.

== Other animals ==
Uterine fibroids are rare in other mammals, although they have been observed in certain dogs and Baltic grey seals.

== Research ==
Selective progesterone receptor modulators, such as progenta, have been under investigation. Another selective progesterone receptor modulator asoprisnil is being tested with promising results as a possible treatment for fibroids, intended to provide the advantages of progesterone antagonists without their adverse effects. Low dietary intake of vitamin D is associated with the development of uterine fibroids.

Myomectomy and uterine artery embolisation seem to be equally effective in improving quality of life, as measured 4 years after surgery.
