= Sociological intelligence =

Sociological intelligence is military or competitive intelligence concerning the social stratification, value systems, and group dynamics of a population.

Sociological intelligence is useful to a military intelligence system because sociological concepts are key to understanding a region's stability, military capability, and foreign policy. The importance of sociological intelligence has been demonstrated most prominently in recent conflicts in the former Yugoslavia, Africa, Russia, and the Middle East. The United States' failure to employ sociological intelligence assets was detrimental to dealing with revolutionary Iran, when ignorance and stereotyping of Iranian leadership as "radicals" limited U.S. understanding of the situation.

Historical Development

The first military uses of sociology emerged with the U.S. military, while Soviet ethnographic approaches also shaped the concept. Figures such as Pavel Ivanovich Kushner and Gerhard von Mende are noted pioneers. The earliest documented English occurrence of the term dates to a 1953 U.S. National Security Council report.

In competitive intelligence the term is used to describe a field of sociological enquiry into potential markets or business competitors.
