= Intravenous leiomyomatosis =

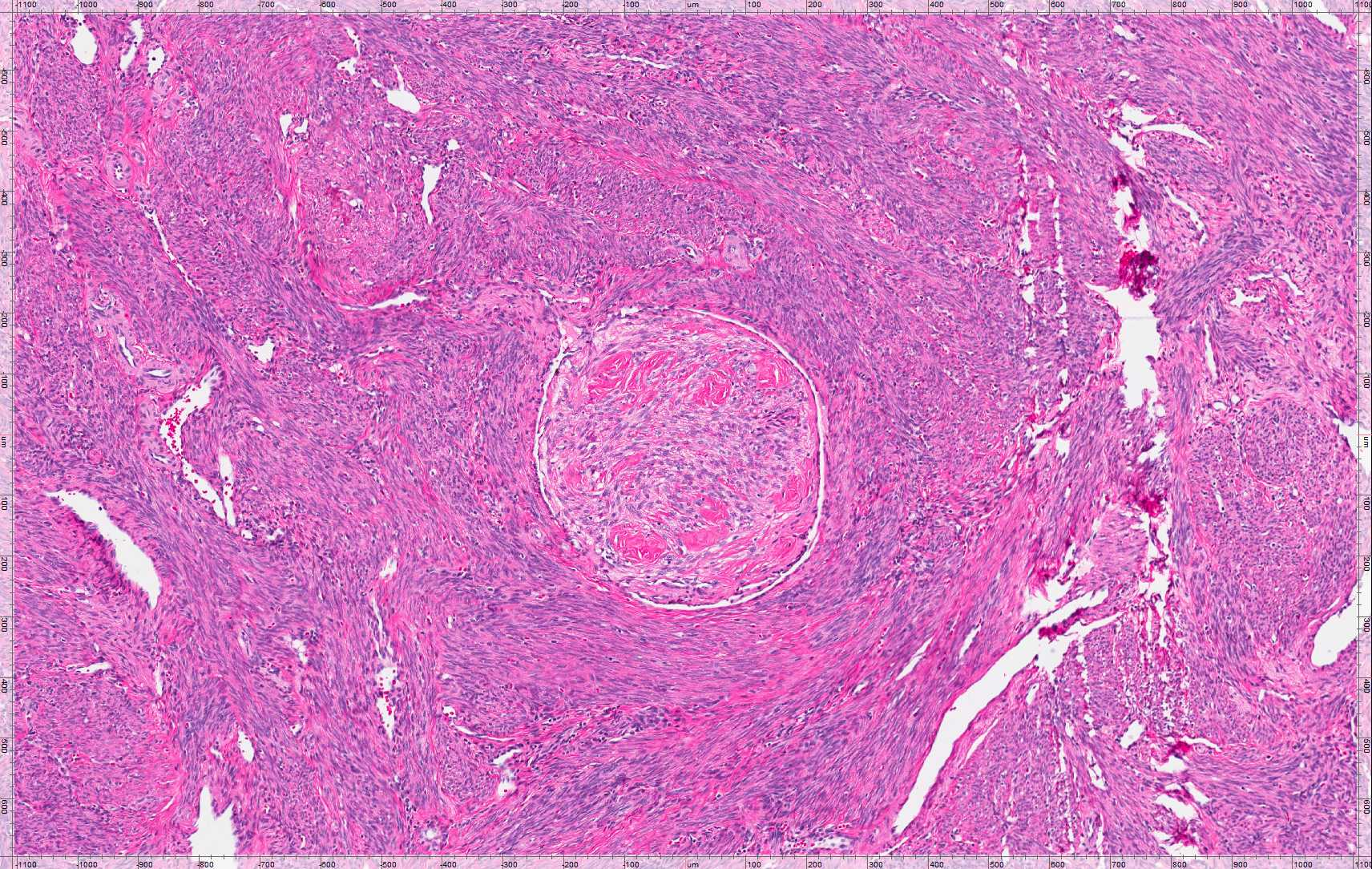
- Intravenous Leiomyoma

Intravenous leiomyomatosis is a rare condition seen exclusively in women in which leiomyomata, benign smooth muscle tumors, are found in veins. The masses are benign-appearing but can spread throughout the venous system leaving the uterus and even cause death when growing into the heart from the IVC. While the possibility that these arose de novo from the smooth muscle in the blood vessel wall was considered, chromosomal analysis suggests a uterine origin. Intravenous leiomyomata are usually but not always associated with uterine fibroids, and tend to recur.

This condition is related to benign metastasizing leiomyoma, in which the masses appear in more distant locations such as the lung and lymph nodes.

== See also ==
Uterine fibroids
