= Military intelligence =

Information about military opponents

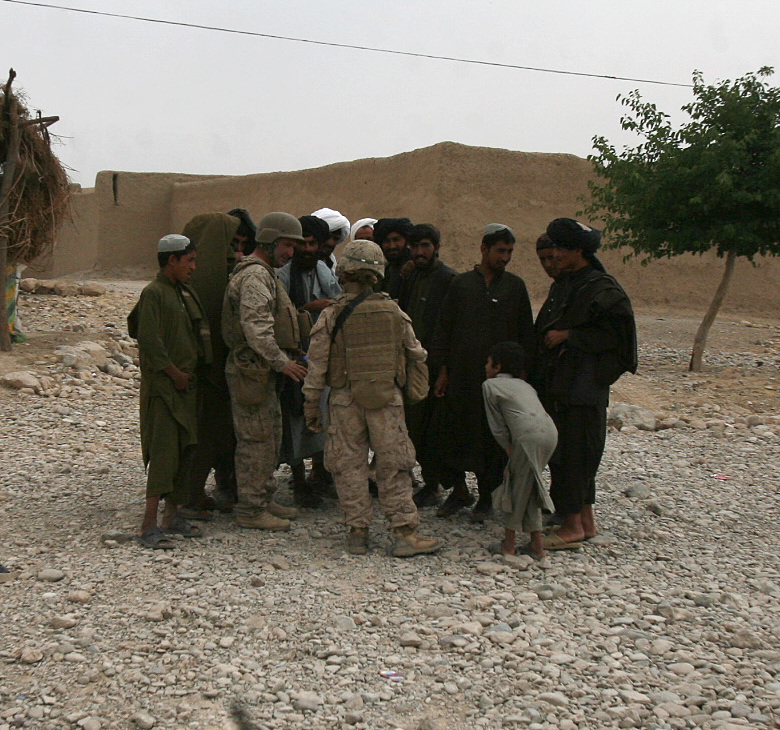
A platoon commander of the 1st Marine Logistics Group, with the battalion interpreter, gather intelligence from local Afghans during a combat logistics patrol to the area, May 9, 2010.

Military intelligence is a military discipline that uses information collection and analysis approaches to provide guidance and direction to assist commanders in their decisions. This aim is achieved by providing an assessment of data from a range of sources, directed towards the commanders' mission requirements or responding to questions as part of operational or campaign planning. To provide an analysis, the commander's information requirements are first identified, which are then incorporated into intelligence collection, analysis, and dissemination.

Areas of study may include the operational environment, hostile, friendly and neutral forces, the civilian population in an area of combat operations, and other broader areas of interest. Intelligence activities are conducted at all levels, from tactical to strategic, in peacetime, the period of transition to war, and during a war itself.

Most governments maintain a military intelligence capability to provide analytical and information collection personnel in both specialist units and from other arms and services. The military and civilian intelligence capabilities collaborate to inform the spectrum of political and military activities.

Personnel performing intelligence duties may be selected for their analytical abilities and personal intelligence before receiving formal training.

== Levels ==
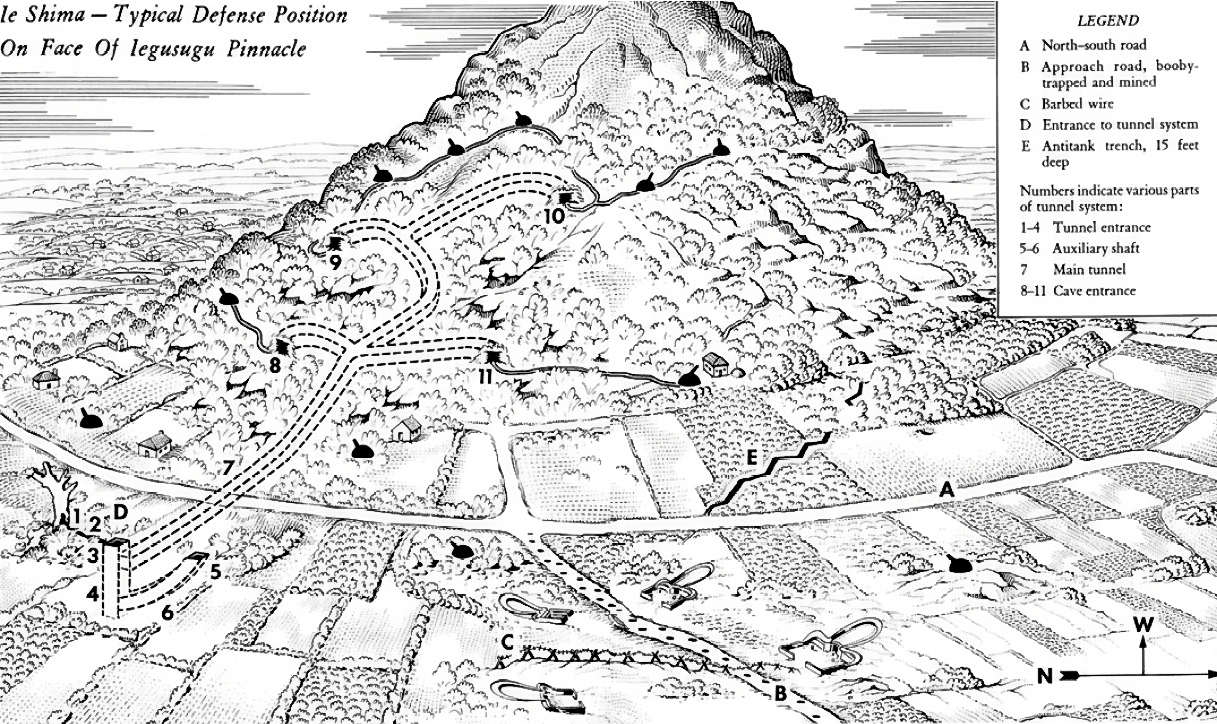
Military intelligence diagram of defense positions during the Battle of Okinawa, 1945

Intelligence operations are carried out throughout the hierarchy of political and military activity.

=== Strategic ===
Strategic intelligence is concerned with broad issues such as economics, political assessments, military capabilities and intentions of foreign nations (and, increasingly, non-state actors). Such intelligence may be scientific, technical, tactical, diplomatic or sociological, but these changes are analyzed in combination with known facts about the area in question, such as geography, demographics and industrial capacities.

Strategic Intelligence is formally defined as "intelligence required for the formation of policy and military plans at national and international levels", and corresponds to the Strategic Level of Warfare, which is formally defined as "the level of warfare at which a nation, often as a member of a group of nations, determines national or multinational (alliance or coalition) strategic security objectives and guidance, then develops and uses national resources to achieve those objectives."

=== Operational ===
Operational intelligence is focused on support or denial of intelligence at operational tiers. The operational tier is below the strategic level of leadership and refers to the design of practical manifestation. Formally defined as "Intelligence that is required for planning and conducting campaigns and major operations to accomplish strategic objectives within theaters or operational areas." It aligns with the Operational Level of Warfare, defined as "The level of warfare at which campaigns and major operations are planned, conducted, and sustained to achieve strategic objectives within theaters or other operational areas."

The term operation intelligence is used within law enforcement to refer to intelligence that supports long-term investigations into multiple, similar targets. Operational intelligence, in the discipline of law enforcement intelligence, is concerned primarily with identifying, targeting, detecting and intervening in criminal activity. The use within law enforcement and law enforcement intelligence is not scaled to its use in general intelligence or military/naval intelligence, being more narrowed in scope.

=== Tactical ===
Tactical intelligence is focused on support to operations at the tactical level and would be attached to the battlegroup. At the tactical level, briefings are delivered to patrols on current threats and collection priorities. These patrols are then debriefed to elicit information for analysis and communication through the reporting chain.

Tactical Intelligence is formally defined as "intelligence required for the planning and conduct of tactical operations", and corresponds with the Tactical Level of Warfare, itself defined as "the level of warfare at which battles and engagements are planned and executed to achieve military objectives assigned to tactical units or task forces".

== Tasking ==
Intelligence should respond to the needs of leadership, based on the military objective and operational plans. The military objective provides a focus for the estimate process, from which a number of information requirements are derived. Information requirements may be related to terrain and impact on vehicle or personnel movement, disposition of hostile forces, sentiments of the local population and capabilities of the hostile order of battle.

In response to the information requirements, analysts examine existing information, identifying gaps in the available knowledge. Where gaps in knowledge exist, the staff may be able to task collection assets to target the requirement.

Analysis reports draw on all available sources of information, whether drawn from existing material or collected in response to the requirement. The analysis reports are used to inform the remaining planning staff, influencing planning and seeking to predict adversary intent.

This process is described as Collection Co-ordination and Intelligence Requirement Management (CCIRM).

== Process ==
The process of intelligence has four phases: collection, analysis, processing and dissemination.

In the United Kingdom these are known as direction, collection, processing and dissemination.

In the U.S. military, Joint Publication 2-0 (JP 2–0) states: "The six categories of intelligence operations are: planning and direction; collection; processing and exploitation; analysis and production; dissemination and integration; and evaluation and feedback."

=== Collection ===
Many of the most important facts are well known or may be gathered from public sources. This form of information collection is known as open-source intelligence. For example, the population, ethnic make-up and main industries of a region are extremely important to military commanders, and this information is usually public. It is however imperative that the collector of information understands that what is collected is "information", and does not become intelligence until after an analyst has evaluated and verified this information. Collection of read materials, composition of units or elements, disposition of strength, training, tactics, personalities (leaders) of these units and elements contribute to the overall intelligence value after careful analysis.

The tonnage and basic weaponry of most capital ships and aircraft are also public, and their speeds and ranges can often be reasonably estimated by experts, often just from photographs. Ordinary facts like the lunar phase on particular days or the ballistic range of common military weapons are also very valuable to planning, and are habitually collected in an intelligence library.

A great deal of useful intelligence can be gathered from photointerpretation of detailed high-altitude pictures of a country. Photointerpreters generally maintain catalogs of munitions factories, military bases and crate designs in order to interpret munition shipments and inventories.

Most intelligence services maintain or support groups whose only purpose is to keep maps. Since maps also have valuable civilian uses, these agencies are often publicly associated or identified as other parts of the government. Some historic counterintelligence services, especially in Russia and China, have intentionally banned or placed disinformation in public maps; good intelligence can identify this disinformation.

It is commonplace for the intelligence services of large countries to read every published journal of the nations in which it is interested, and the main newspapers and journals of every nation. This is a basic source of intelligence.

It is also common for diplomatic and journalistic personnel to have a secondary goal of collecting military intelligence. For western democracies, it is extremely rare for journalists to be paid by an official intelligence service, but they may still patriotically pass on tidbits of information they gather as they carry on their legitimate business. Also, much public information in a nation may be unavailable from outside the country. This is why most intelligence services attach members to foreign service offices.

Some industrialized nations also eavesdrop continuously on the entire radio spectrum, interpreting it in real time. This includes not only broadcasts of national and local radio and television, but also local military traffic, radar emissions and even microwaved telephone and telegraph traffic, including satellite traffic.

The U.S. in particular is known to maintain satellites that can intercept cell-phone and pager traffic, usually referred to as the ECHELON system. Analysis of bulk traffic is normally performed by complex computer programs that parse natural language and phone numbers looking for threatening conversations and correspondents. In some extraordinary cases, undersea or land-based cables have been tapped as well.

More exotic secret information, such as encryption keys, diplomatic message traffic, policy and orders of battle are usually restricted to analysts on a need-to-know basis in order to protect the sources and methods from foreign traffic analysis.

=== Analysis ===
Analysis consists of assessment of an adversary's capabilities and vulnerabilities. In a real sense, these are threats and opportunities. Analysts generally look for the least defended or most fragile resource that is necessary for important military capabilities. These are then flagged as critical vulnerabilities. For example, in modern mechanized warfare, the logistics chain for a military unit's fuel supply is often the most vulnerable part of a nation's order of battle.

Human intelligence, gathered by spies, is usually carefully tested against unrelated sources. It is notoriously prone to inaccuracy. In some cases, sources will just make up imaginative stories for pay, or they may try to settle grudges by identifying personal enemies as enemies of the state that is paying for the intelligence. However, human intelligence is often the only form of intelligence that provides information about an opponent's intentions and rationales, and it is therefore often uniquely valuable to successful negotiation of diplomatic solutions.

In some intelligence organizations, analysis follows a procedure. First, general media and sources are screened to locate items or groups of interest, and then their location, capabilities, inputs and environment are systematically assessed for vulnerabilities using a continuously updated list of typical vulnerabilities.

=== Filing ===
Critical vulnerabilities are then indexed in a way that makes them easily available to advisors and line intelligence personnel who package this information for policy-makers and war-fighters. Vulnerabilities are usually indexed by the nation and military unit with a list of possible attack methods.

Critical threats are usually maintained in a prioritized file, with important enemy capabilities analyzed on a schedule set by an estimate of the enemy's preparation time. For example, nuclear threats between the USSR and the U.S. were analyzed in real time by continuously on-duty staffs. In contrast, analysis of tank or army deployments are usually triggered by accumulations of fuel and munitions, which are monitored every few days. In some cases, automated analysis is performed in real time on automated data traffic.

Packaging threats and vulnerabilities for decision-makers is a crucial part of military intelligence. A good intelligence officer will stay very close to the policy-maker or war fighter to anticipate their information requirements and tailor the information needed. A good intelligence officer will also ask a fairly large number of questions in order to help anticipate needs. For an important policy-maker, the intelligence officer will have a staff to which research projects can be assigned.

Developing a plan of attack is not the responsibility of intelligence, though it helps an analyst to know the capabilities of common types of military units. Generally, policy-makers are presented with a list of threats and opportunities. They approve some basic action, and then professional military personnel plan the detailed act and carry it out. Once hostilities begin, target selection often moves into the upper end of the military chain of command. Once ready stocks of weapons and fuel are depleted, logistic concerns are often exported to civilian policy-makers.

=== Dissemination ===
The processed intelligence information is disseminated through database systems, intel bulletins and briefings to the different decision-makers. The bulletins may also include consequently resulting information requirements and thus conclude the intelligence cycle.

== Military intelligence organisations ==
- Defence Intelligence Organisation (Australia)
- Canadian Forces Intelligence Command (Canada)
- Intelligence Branch (Canadian Forces)
- Military Intelligence (Czech Republic)
- Direction du Renseignement Militaire (France)
- Bundesnachrichtendienst (BND – German Federal Intelligence Service) and Militärischer Abschirmdienst (MAD- German Military Counter-Intelligence)
- Directorate General of Forces Intelligence (Bangladesh)
- Military Intelligence and Reconnaissance (Egypt) (Egypt)
- Strategic Intelligence Agency (Indonesia)
- Defence Intelligence Agency (India)
  - Directorate of Military Intelligence
  - Directorate of Naval Intelligence
  - Directorate of Air Intelligence
- Directorate of Military Intelligence (Ireland)
- Aman (Israel)
- Centro Intelligence Interforze (Italy)
- Malaysian Defence Intelligence Organisation (Malaysia)
- Defence Intelligence Agency (Nigeria)
- Inter-Services Intelligence and Military Intelligence of Pakistan
- Centro de Informações e Segurança Militares (CISMIL – Portugal)
- Glavnoye Razvedyvatel'noye Upravleniye (GRU – Russian Military Intelligence)
- Military Intelligence Agency (VOA – Serbia)
- Armed Forces Intelligence Center (Spain)
- Defence Intelligence and the Intelligence Corps (UK)
- United States Intelligence Community
  - Defense Intelligence Agency
  - G-2, US Army unit
  - Military Intelligence Corps
  - Marine Corps Intelligence
  - Office of Naval Intelligence
  - Sixteenth Air Force
  - Coast Guard Intelligence
- Defence Intelligence Division of the South African National Defence Force (South Africa)
- General Department of Defence Intelligence (Vietnam)

== See also ==
- Admiralty code
- Aesopian language
- Battlespace
- Classified information
- Company Level Intelligence Cell
- Counterintelligence
- Cultural intelligence
- Cryptography
- Disinformation
- Deuxième Bureau
- Edmund Charaszkiewicz
- Electronic warfare
- Espionage
- Fog of war
- Intelligence (information gathering)
- Intelligence gathering network
- Intelligence, Surveillance, Target Acquisition, and Reconnaissance
- Intelligence outsourcing
- Interrogation
- James Gannon (author)
- Medical intelligence
- Meteorological intelligence
- Military secrets
- Reconnaissance
- Scenario planning
- Spy satellite
- Strategic intelligence
- Tactical Ground Intercept Facility
- Technical intelligence
- List of intelligence gathering disciplines
