= Tactical Ground Intercept Facility =

Tactical Ground Intercept Facility (TGIF) is a United States Military Intelligence collection platform. It was a two-piece collection platform with digital audio receivers on a high altitude reconnaissance aircraft which use microwaves to redirect the intercepted audio back to linguists and ELINT specialists on the ground to provide near-real-time intelligence for theater commanders.
