= Transforming growth interacting factor =

Transforming growth interacting factor (TGIF) is a potential repressor of TGF-β pathways in myometrial cells. Expression of TGIF is increased in uterine leiomyoma compared with myometrium.
