= Genital disease =

Genital disease may refer to:

- Sexually transmitted disease
- Other female genital disease
- Other male genital disease
