= ORG-201745 =

Chemical compound

Clinical data
- Drug class: Progestin; Progestogen

Identifiers
- CAS Number: 1225638-79-8
- PubChem SID: 472220258

ORG-201745 is a progestin which was originated by Organon and was under development by Schering-Plough (which acquired Organon in 2007) for the treatment of "female genital diseases" and as a hormonal contraceptive for the prevention of pregnancy but was never marketed.
