= Epidemiology of suicide =

Worldwide incidence of suicide

There are more than 720,000 estimated global suicide deaths every year. Suicide affects every demographic, yet there are some populations that are more impacted than others. For example, among 15–29 year olds, suicide is much more prominent; this being the third leading cause of death within this age group.

There are many competing factors that come into play when determining the epidemiology of suicide such as biological sex, race and sexual orientation, religion, social determinants of health, and seasonal trends.

== Overview ==
Suicide rates are actively increasing around the globe. It is an increasingly common idealization, with someone considering taking their own life every 40 seconds. From the years 2000–2021 suicide rates have gone up approximately 36%.

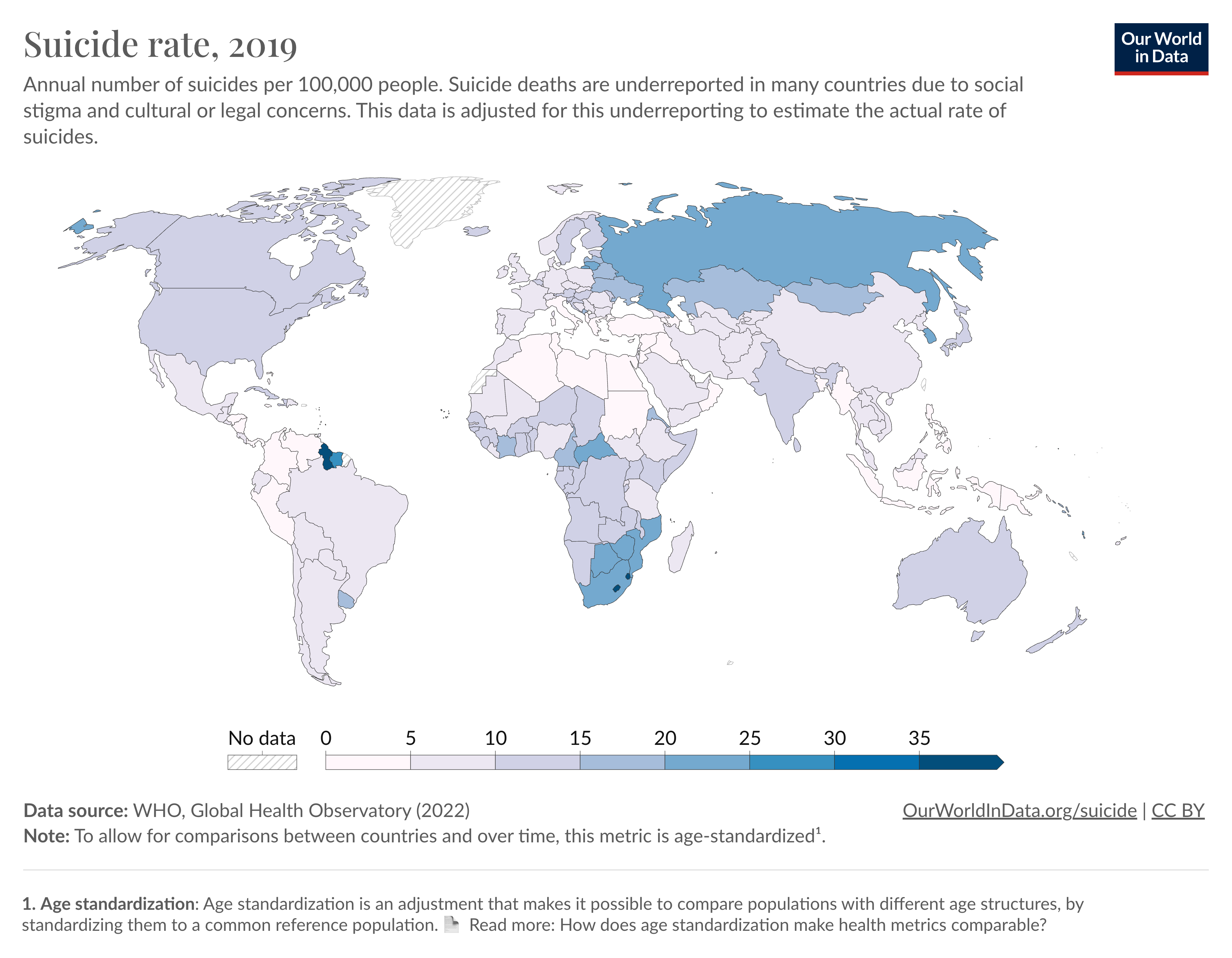
Annual number of suicides per 100,000 people in 2019

The cause of this increased risk of suicide can be attributed to multiple factors. While there is no single defined cause of suicide, there are three overarching themes when it comes to causation: health, environmental and historical factors.

Health causes could be related to mental health diagnosis such as depression, schizophrenia, anxiety disorders or traumatic brain injuries. Around 46% of suicide cases had previously been diagnosed with a mental health disorder. This is a fluctuating estimate due to the fact that mental health is often overlooked and under reported.

Environmental causes could be access to weapons or drugs, childhood stress or exposures to other abuses. Bullying is a common catalyst as it increases social isolation and self deprivation in the same prolonged instances. "According to studies by Yale University, victims of bullying are between 2 to 9 times more likely to consider suicide than non-victims."

Historical factors also play a role. Exposure to suicide in the developmental years can put an individual at increased risk of their own death. Many studies have been conducted to conclude that suicide contagion is a serious problem, especially for young people. Suicide can be facilitated in vulnerable teens by exposure to real or fictional accounts of suicide, including media coverage of suicide, such as intensive reporting of the suicide of a celebrity or idol.

=== Geography- Country ===
Share of deaths from suicide, 2017

As of 2019, the highest annual number of suicides per 100,000 people was in Lesotho, with a rate of 87.5 deaths per 100,000 people. The second country being Guyana with 40.9 deaths per 100,000 people and third Eswatini, with 40.5 deaths per 100,000 people.

Low-income countries share the burden of suicidal persons due to their impoverished state which explains the top three countries on the suicide rate list.

In other parts of the world, suicide rates are not as extreme, but the issue of suicide is still extremely apparent.

About 21.6 suicide deaths per 100,000 people occur in Russia every year; in southern Africa, the average is about 21 deaths per 100,000 people. The United States reports about 14.5 deaths annually per 100,000 people, however, this rate is steadily increasing. In the 2000s, that rate was 10 people per 100,000 people per year. Within countries there is variety as well. As of 2021, Wyoming is the leading state in annual suicide with 32.3 deaths per 100,000 people. On the other hand, New Jersey, has the lowest suicide rate with 7.1 deaths per 100,000 people.

Rural and Urban suicide rates differ as well.

== Sex ==
Suicide rates per 100,000 males (left/up) and females (right/down).

0–5
5–10

10–15
15–25

25–35
Above 35

No data

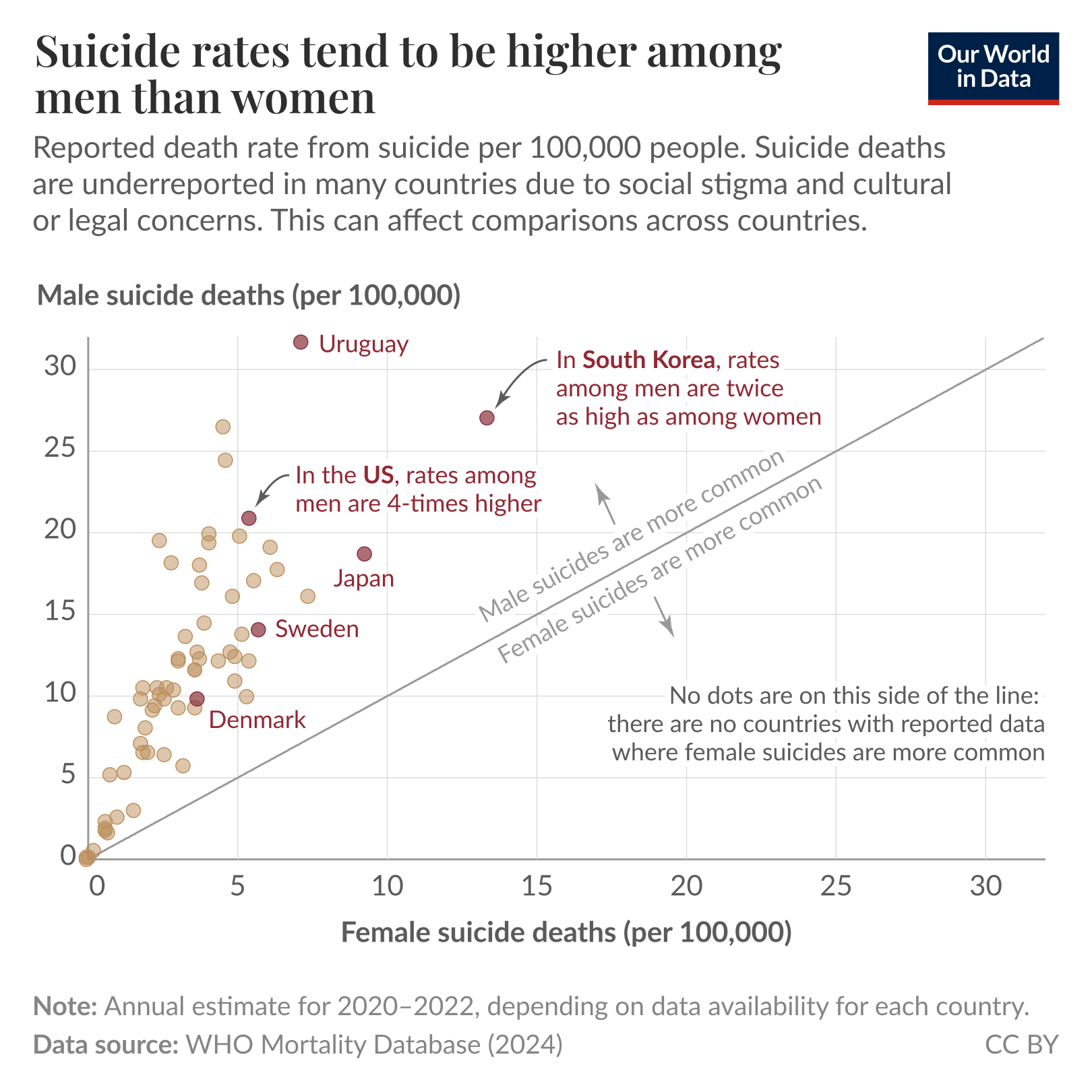
Suicides rates of men compared to those of women by country

In the United States, males are four times more likely to die by suicide than females, although more women than men report suicide attempts and self-harm with suicidal intentions. Male suicide rates are far higher than females in all age groups (the ratio varies from 3:1 to 10:1). In other western countries, males are also much more likely to die by suicide than females (usually by a factor of 3–4:1). It was the 8th leading cause of death for males, and 19th leading cause of death for females.

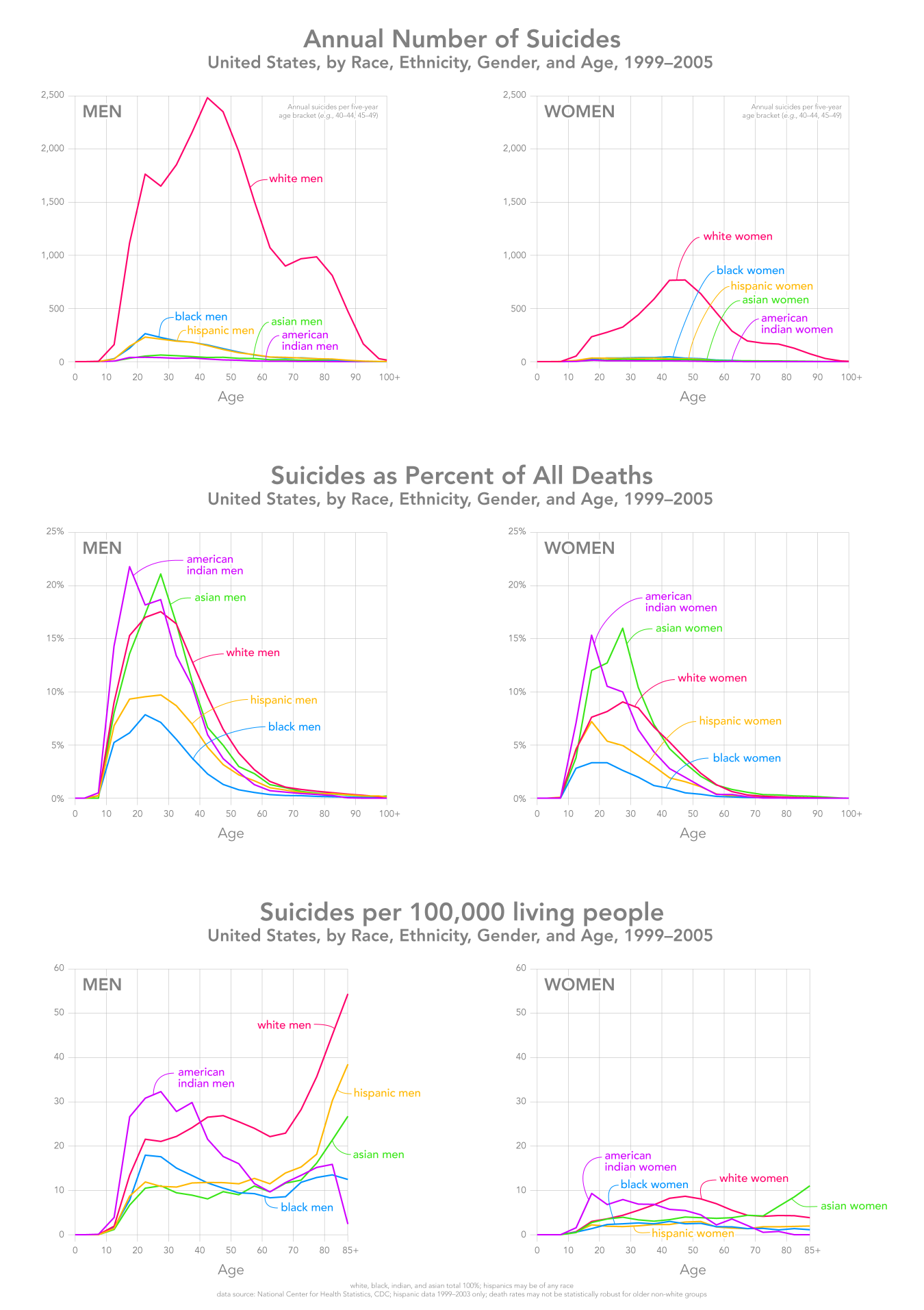
U.S. Suicides by age, gender, and racial or ethnic group, 1999–2005. Data from the CDC. Racial and ethnic groups defined by the U.S. Office of Management and Budget.

Excess male mortality from suicide is generally lower in non-Western nations. In eight countries, including China with about one-fifth of the world population, the rate of male mortality from suicide is lower than that for females, with females more likely to die by suicide by a factor of 1.3–1.6

== Age ==
Nearly half of all suicides in the United States are accounted for in the age range of 35–64 years. Adults aged 75 and older are at increased risk of suicide rates (20.3 per 100,000). However suicide may be a lower percentage accounting for all suicides across the United States, in a subgroup of ages 10–24 it is the second leading cause of death.

== Race and sexual orientation ==
=== Race ===
Research across the United States shows that across all age groups, Non-Hispanic Alaskan Natives and American Indians are at the highest risk of suicide. In years 2018–2021, suicide rates significantly increased within these populations.

In 2003 in the United States, Whites and Asians were nearly 2.5 times more likely to kill themselves than Blacks or Mexicans. In the eastern portion of the world (primarily in Asian and Pacific-Island countries), the numbers of reported suicides are growing every year.

=== Sexual orientation ===
The likelihood of suicide attempts are increased in both gay males and lesbians, as well as bisexuals of both sexes when compared to their heterosexual counterparts. The trend of having a higher incident rate among females is no exception with lesbians or bisexual females, and when compared with homosexual males, lesbians are more likely to attempt suicide than gay or bisexual males.

Evidence varies between studies with how increased the risk of suicide in the queer community in comparison to heterosexuals. The lowest reported increases stated suicide is 0.8–1.1 times more likely for queer females and 1.5–2.5 times more likely for queer males. The highest increases reach 4.6 more likely in females and 14.6 more likely in males who do not identify as heterosexual.

Race and age also play a factor in the increased risk. The highest ratios for males are for Caucasians in their youth. By the age of 25, their risk is down to less than half of what it was However gay Black males' risk steadily increases to 8.6 times more likely in this same age group. Lifetime risks are 5.7 times more for White and 12.8 times more for Black gay and bisexual males.

In lesbian and bisexual females, age has opposite effect with fewer attempts in youth when compared to heterosexual females. Throughout their lifetime, the likelihood of LGBTQ+ females to attempt suicide nearly triples the youth ratio for Caucasian females, however for Black females, the rate is less significant (less than 0.1 to 0.3 difference) with heterosexual Black females having a slightly higher risk throughout most of the age-based study.

Gay and lesbian youth who attempt suicide are disproportionately subject to anti-gay attitudes, and have weaker skills for coping with discrimination, isolation, and loneliness. They were also more likely to experience family rejection than those who do not attempt suicide. Another study found that gay and bisexual youth who attempted suicide had a more feminine gender presentation, adopted an LGBTQ+ identity at a young age, and were more likely than their peers to report sexual abuse, drug abuse, and arrests for misconduct.

There is evidence that same-sex sexual behavior, but not homosexual attraction or homosexual identity, was significantly predictive of suicide among Norwegian adolescents. In Denmark, the age-adjusted suicide mortality risk for men in registered domestic partnerships was nearly eight times greater than for men with positive histories of heterosexual marriage, and nearly twice as high for men who had never married.

A large study of suicide in Sweden involved the analysis of data records for 6,456 same-sex married couples and 1,181,723 man-women marriages. The study showed that even with Sweden's tolerant attitude regarding homosexuality, it was determined that for same-sex married men, the suicide risk was nearly three times higher than for different-sex married men, even after an adjustment for HIV status. For women, it was shown that there was a tentatively elevated suicide risk for same-sex married women over that of different-sex married women.

== Religion ==
Every major religion in the world is opposed to suicide. However, the stringency of this belief depends on the individual. Teachings within religions may vary and different individuals may interpret these teachings differently.

Suicide rates between different religions vary. Among the major religions in the US, Protestants have the highest rate of suicide. Roman Catholics had the next highest rate, followed by Jews and Muslims.

In most cases, religiosity has been associated with reduced risk of suicide. Collectively, individuals who reside in religious countries and are integrated into their religious community are less accepting of suicide Compared to secular countries, suicide rates are lower in countries with a state religion. A global study on atheism noted countries with higher levels of atheism had the highest suicide rates compared to countries with "statistically insignificant levels of organic atheism." The People's Republic of China, which is an atheist state, had the highest suicide rate (25.6 per 100,000 persons).

However, studies have been criticized for oversimplifying the relationship between religion and the risk of suicide, as this association can vary depending on culture. Religion may adversely affect mental health if there is discord between an individual's beliefs and their faith. In some cases, religion may be related to a higher risk of suicide if it leads a person to feel guilty, isolated, or abandoned by the community; but in general religion is protective against suicide attempts and suicide. Additionally, there is evidence to suggest that while religious affiliation protects against suicide attempts and suicide, it does not stop suicidal ideation.

== Social, political and economic factors ==
The US has had the largest number of gun-related suicides in the world every year from 1990 through at least 2019. With 4% of the world's population, the US had 44% of global gun suicides in 2019, and the highest rate per capita.

For both men and women, gun suicide death rates are positively correlated with states' household gun ownership rates.

A 2023 study concluded that more restrictive state gun policies reduced homicide and suicide gun deaths. From 1991 to 2016—when most states implemented more restrictive gun laws—gun deaths fell sharply.

Higher levels of social and national cohesion reduce suicide rates. Suicide levels are highest among the retired, unemployed, impoverished, divorced, the childless, empty nesters, and other people who live alone. Suicide rates also rise during times of economic uncertainty. (Although poverty is not a direct cause, it can contribute to the risk of suicide).

Epidemiological studies generally show a relationship between suicide or suicidal behaviors and socio-economic disadvantage. Disadvantages include limited educational achievement, homelessness, unemployment, economic dependence, and contact with the police or justice system. It has been shown for individuals who suffer from unemployment, the longer they are unemployed, the greater the risk of suicide. Additionally, the lifetime prevalence of suicidal ideation in the homeless community was 41.60% while the lifetime prevalence of suicide attempt was 28.88%. Community-level violence has also been linked to higher suicide risk. For example, a 2025 study found that a one-unit increase in local homicide rates was followed by a 3.6 % rise in suicide rates the next year, suggesting that sustained exposure to violence within a community may contribute to suicide risk.

A 2015 UK study by the Office for National Statistics, commissioned by Public Health England, which considered 18,998 deaths of people aged between 20 and 64, found that the employment sectors with the highest incidence of suicide for men was construction, and for women culture, media and sport, healthcare, and primary school teaching.

Men working in the construction industry and women employed in culture, media and sport, healthcare and primary school teaching are at the highest risk of suicide, official figures for England suggest.

Certain political constructs can act as protective factors against suicide. The most apparent factor is an increase in minimum wage which precedes inflation. Other factors include social welfare expenditures, and laws which restrict access to firearms and alcohol.

== Health ==
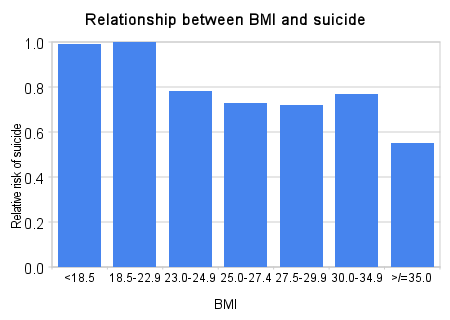
Risk of suicide decreases with increased body mass index in the United States.

=== Mental illness ===
Societally, mental disorders are highly associated with suicide risk and deaths. Statistically, there is data to support this. In high income countries, mental or substance abuse disorders can be attributed to 80% of suicide deaths. In low income countries, the percentage is slightly lower at 70%. Mental illnesses that have been associated with suicide risk include major depressive disorder (MDD), anxiety disorders, bipolar disorder, dysthymia, and schizophrenia.

=== Physical health conditions ===
In addition to mental disorders, physical health issues have an impact on suicide risk. After adjusting for age, sex, mental health, and substance use diagnoses, nine conditions have been positively associated with suicide risk. The study claimed this association with the following conditions: back pain, brain injury, cancer, congestive heart failure, COPD, epilepsy, HIV/AIDS, migraine, and sleep disorders. The risk of suicide in people with traumatic brain injuries is almost nine times higher than normal which makes it the highest risk condition. Comorbidity of conditions was also shown to significantly increase the risk of suicide.

=== Body mass index ===
Risk of suicide may decrease with increased weight and is low in obese persons. The connection is not well understood, but it is hypothesized that elevated body weight results in higher circulating levels of tryptophan, serotonin, and leptin, which in turn reduces impulsivity.

However, other studies indicate that suicide rates increase with extreme obesity, and it is difficult to control for conflating factors such as BMI-related differences in longevity, which have a significant bearing on suicide rates.

=== Physical illness and functional disability in older adults ===
In adults aged 65 and older, suicidal behavior has been associated with certain functional disabilities and specific conditions. These positively associated conditions and disabilities are the following: malignant diseases, neurological disorders, pain, COPD, liver disease, male genital disorders, and arthritis. Generally speaking, illnesses that threaten the independence of a person, make them doubt their usefulness, value or dignity, or minimize their pleasure with life are more likely to be suicidogenic.

== Season ==
The idea that suicide is more common during the winter holidays (including Christmas in the Northern Hemisphere) is a myth, generally reinforced by media coverage associating suicide with the holiday season. The National Center for Health Statistics found that suicides drop during the winter months, and peak during spring and early summer. Considering that there is a correlation between the winter season and rates of depression, there are theories that this might be accounted for by capability to die by suicide and relative cheerfulness.

Suicide has also been linked to other seasonal factors.

Seasonal allergies have shown potential impacts on rates of suicide. Based on the reaction that allergens cause, animal models have shown an increase in anxiety-like behavior, reduced social interaction, and aggressive behavior which can be considered endophenotypes for suicidal behavior.

There is significant variation in suicide risk by day of the week, which is greater than any seasonal variation.

== Trends ==
Certain time trends can be related to the type of death. In the United Kingdom for example, the steady decline in suicides between 1960 and 1971 may be due to the near total removal of carbon monoxide from domestic gas supplies. This removal occurred rapidly as society switched primarily from coal gas to natural gas during the 1960s. By 1971, natural gas had taken over 69% of the domestic consumer market.

Methods vary across cultures, and the easy availability of lethal agents and materials plays a role.

Due to social stigma and misclassified cause of death, reported suicide rated are never exact. It is estimated that in the year 2000, global number of suicides were 791,855. As of 2019, there were 703,220 reported instances of suicide. This is a relative difference of 11%. This trend shows a decrease in suicide deaths, however, there is contradicting evidence which shows an overall increase in suicide. This discrepancy requires further research and comparison.

There is the possibility that one individual may have multiple suicide attempts, however, they can only have one suicide. Suicide attempts are up to 20 times more frequent than suicides.

An increase in U.S. baseline temperature due to global warming projects an increase in suicide. With an increase between 1 and 6 degrees Celsius above the baseline, climate change‐attributable suicide in the United States is expected to increase from 283 to 1,660 cases.

Historical data show lower suicide rates during periods of war. However, this has been questioned in more recent studies, which showed a more complex picture than was previously conceived. More research is required to fully understand this complicated relationship.

== See also ==
- Copycat suicide
- Suicide epidemic
- Suicide in the military
