= ORG-47241 =

Chemical compound

Clinical data
- Drug class: Progestin; Progestogen

Identifiers
- CAS Number: 1225638-77-6

ORG-47241 is a progestin which was under development by Organon for the treatment of "female genital diseases" and as a hormonal contraceptive for the prevention of pregnancy but was never marketed.
