= Suicide epidemic =

Rapid increase of suicides

A suicide epidemic is a large number of suicides taking place over a period of time in a manner that resembles a disease epidemic. Such epidemics have occurred in the former Soviet Union in the 1990s, among police officers, on Indian reservations, and in Micronesia (Suicide epidemic in Micronesia). The Werther effect occurs when suicides that are made publicly known encourage others to imitate them. It has been suggested that the teaching of stories such as Romeo and Juliet may help teens to be more open in discussing suicide among young people.

== See also ==
- Mass suicide
- Epidemiology of suicide
- Copycat suicide
