= Suicide epidemic in Micronesia =

Rise in suicides in Micronesia from 1960 to 1987

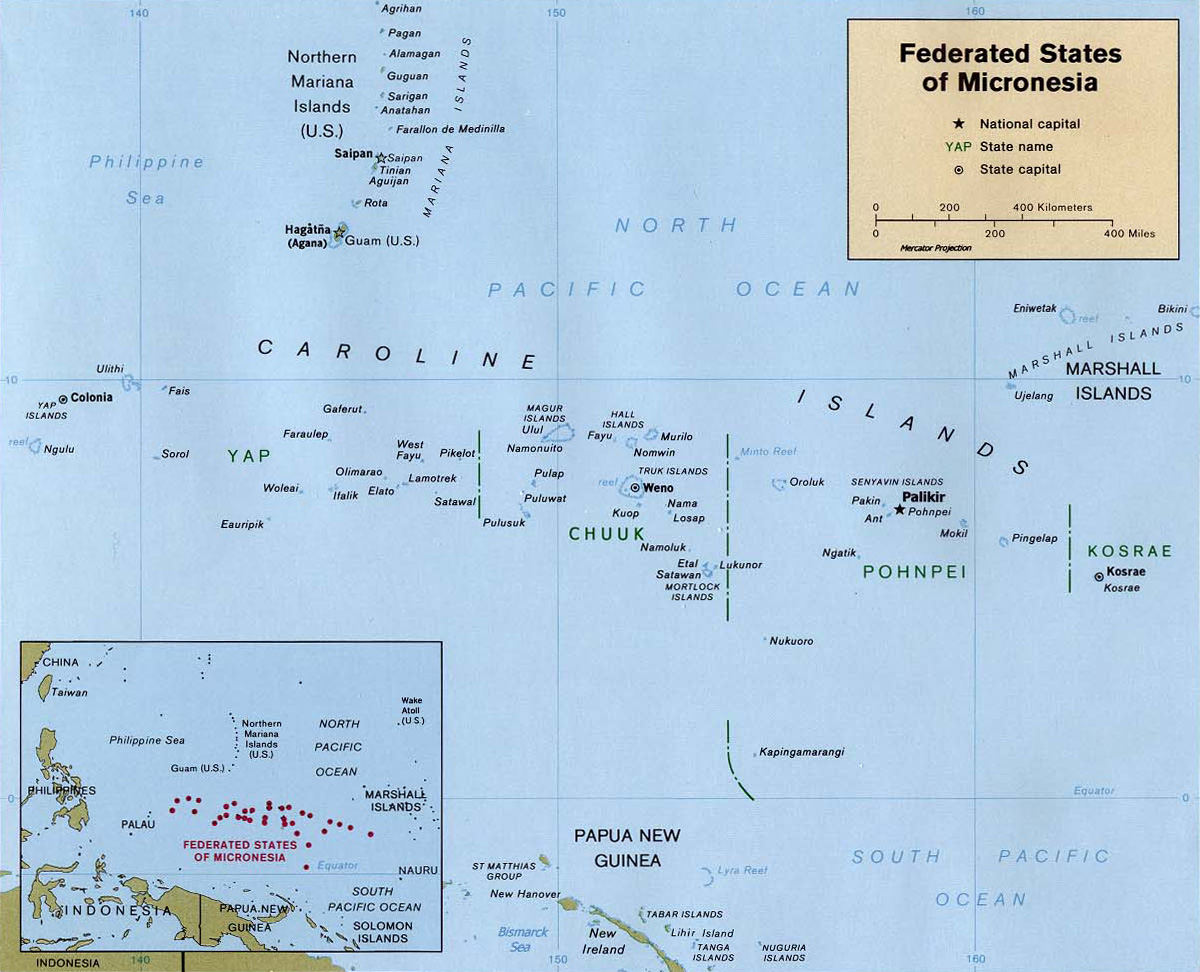
Map of the various islands in Micronesia

The Suicide Epidemic in Micronesia refers to the sudden acceleration of individual suicide cases between 1960 and 1987, in the Pacific islands of Micronesia. Located in the North-western region of the Pacific Ocean, the islands of Palau, Yap, Ponape, the Federated States of Micronesia, the Marshall Islands, Kiribati and Truk had collectively experienced at least 532 deaths of mainly young men, over a 27-year period. Initiatives in providing explanations for this peculiar and morbid social phenomenon were originally led by anthropologist Donald Rubinstein. Early research shows that suicide in Micronesia was an extremely rare occurrence until 1960 where they first experienced six male deaths that year, with rates continuing to accelerate through the 1970s at 10.8 deaths per 100,000 people. At its peak, Micronesia recorded a rate of 28.2 suicides per 100,000 people for one year at the onset of the 1980s.

Interestingly, suicides are seemingly provoked by trivial inconveniences the victim was exposed to moments before. This is one reason that this epidemic has attracted many sociopsychological theories as to why this dramatic trend in suicide occurred and is still occurring today.

A member from the Marshall Islands recalls:

"Fifteen years ago when there was a suicide, people would talk and talk about it. But now it seems that there is a suicide nearly every month and it's hardly news."

== Demographic ==
The modal demographic of cases are young men aged 15 to 24 years old. Whilst the majority of cases include men, female cases represented a 1:16 ratio originally yet newer research has this proportion closer to 1:11.

Originally the island with the most frequent suicides was the island of Truk however as of 2021 the island of Kiribati leads the figures for highest mortality rate.

=== Issues with original research papers ===
Although Donald Rubinstein's series of papers introduce this phenomenon to the greater world, the refinement of his statistics by modern researchers is an example of where his research should be met caution. The concurrent validity of modern studies suggest that the pioneering Rubinstein papers were perhaps susceptible to flaws including gender bias and exaggerating the differences between genders.

Additionally, modern research has expanded beyond the four islands Rubinstein originally investigated. By studying how suicides vary in different islands, this improves how suicide prevention techniques can be applied and generalised to all the islands studied.

==== Possible suicide evidence pre-1960 ====
There is contradictory evidence showing that suicide was a documented occurrence before 1960, prior to when Rubinstein suggested the suicides began.

== Typical biography of a suicide ==
The following is the typical pattern of events that precede a suicide, based on the concurrent literature.

An 18-year-old boy, with no prior history of self-harm or attempted suicide, who works in manual labour near home gets into a minor domestic conflict, like being 'scolded by his mother.' They would then find an empty room in the proximity of their home and tie noose to a doorknob or something on the floor so that they would lean into the tightening rope causing a loss of consciousness and death by anoxia.

=== Key features of the biographies ===
==== Domestic situation ====
With no previous history of mental disorder or self-harming behaviour, 'spats' with one's girlfriend or father was a common precursor, yet siblings were also equally influential in the death of an older or younger brother. An example from the records show that a 17-year-old boy hanged himself after being 'reprimanded' by an older brother for making noise.

==== Method and symbolic experimentation ====
Death by hanging is the most common method of suicide yet it is noted that the rope was tied onto a doorknob or low-bearing part of the room. This unconventional method, alongside testimony from a person who attempted suicide, fuelled the theory, popularised by Malcolm Gladwell's book The Tipping Point, that these boys wanted to "try out" hanging alluding to the act as a form of self-expression.

Variations to the typical method has perhaps changed, according to modern research by Mathieu and colleagues. People from Kiribati use self-poisoning as the main method of suicide due to the availability of pesticides and lack of exposure to firearms or other means.

Although this research does reinforce the prevalence of current rates of suicide in Micronesia, this variation of suicide can only be applied to the island of Kiribati as this was the only island investigated in this study.

== Notable case studies ==
=== Sima ===
On a Saturday morning, a 17-year-old boy from Chuuk named Sima, and his friend, was asked by Sima's grandfather to find a bamboo pole-knife so they can collect breadfruit. After returning to grandfather empty handed, the grandfather threatened and dismissed Sima from the house suggesting 'the family will go hungry' because of Sima's negligence. As they walk back, Sima splits off alone to enter a 'vacated' house from his mother's village. After asking his younger brother for a pen, Sima was found later that night immobile and awkwardly hanging in an empty room with a note reading:

"October 6, 1990

My life is coming to an end at this time. Now today is a day of sorrow for myself, also a day of suffering for me. But it is a day of celebration for Papa. Today Papa sent me away.

Thank you for loving me so little, [signed] Sima

Give my farewell to Mama. Mama, you won't have any more frustration or trouble from your boy. Much love from Sima."

Sima's suicide note has been the centre of much speculation into the social meaning and symbolism for these suicides. Author Malcolm Gladwell notes there is an expression of "wounded pride... a protest against mistreatment." It is well documented that harsh discipline was not an uncommon family value however the idea that strict parenting can lead to suicide does not have much face validity. This case study can arguably be seen as a catalyst for more abstract theories, for example seeing suicide as an attempt at reconciliation with the family or as a form of social communication.

=== 'R' ===
Coming from the island of Ebeye, a man named 'R' was described as an

"intense 29 year old [and] the son of one of the wealthiest Ebeye families."

He had had a child with two women that had no knowledge of one another and could not decide who to commit to. As a result, he hanged himself from the confusion. The two women eventually were distraught at the discovery of one another at R's funeral.

This case is notable for how similar cases involving lovers, girlfriends and wives seemingly began to snowball as the most common precursor to suicide for the island of Ebeye.

=== Additional cases ===
- A 13-year-old boy hanged himself after being yelled at by his mother.
- A 16-year-old boy hanged himself because his father did not give him $1.
- In the rare case that a male over 24-years committed suicide, a seventy-three year old asthmatic committed suicide after his wife would not allow his children from a first marriage to visit him in the hospital.

== Main theories of suicide explanation ==
As most theories of explanation are based on how the traditional family dynamic has changed, it is important to understand what traditional norms were for family lineages in the Micronesian islands.

=== Basic organisation of the family unit ===
According to Hezel, families consisted of 30 to 40 members and acted as a sense of identity for the children and women. The primary focus is on the boys in the clan, whom are raised by the head marshals of the family consisting of many uncles and fathers. These head marshals taught the boys how to gather food so that the island's subsistence economy can be maintained. Harsh discipline was also not uncommon, a great example of how the marshals wanted to teach the young about a flowing economy of basic needs is of Sima's case previously mentioned.

=== Social Disintegration Hypothesis ===
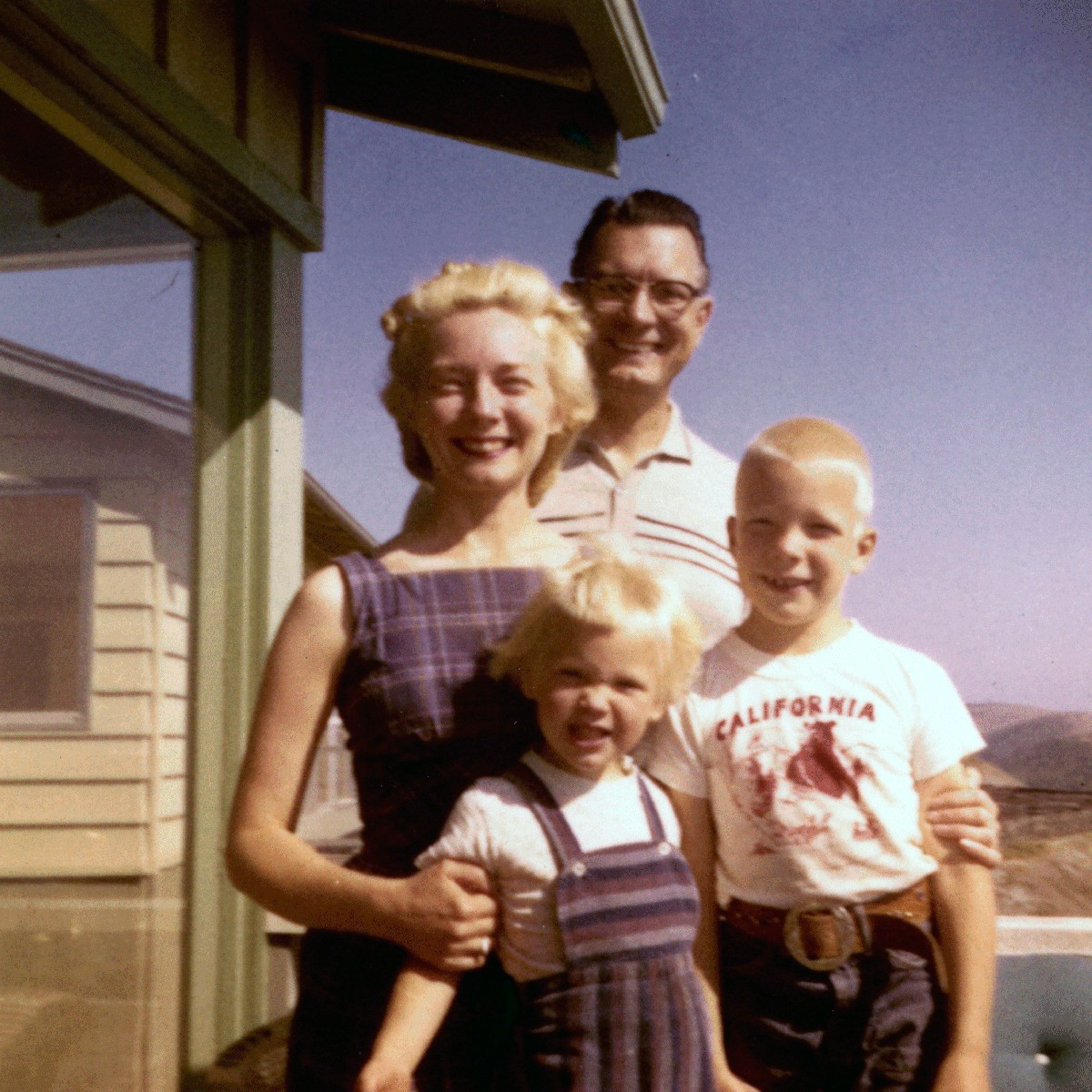
A typical nuclear family. The father as the breadwinner and the mother as the emotional centre for their children

The Social Disintegration Hypothesis describes how the gradual replacement of traditional Micronesian kinship norms by Economic and cultural modernization lead to the nuclearization of the family dynamic.

Following the United States' influx of American dollars into the Pacific Islands, because of the Trustee Territories programme there became less of a need to participate in clan activities in harvesting and collecting food, due to how a new cash economy promoted the buying of retail items. As a result, the father becomes the sole bearer of financial responsibility and subsequently the child's safety, as opposed to the group of uncles and fathers acting as marshals in raising the young male.

According to Hezel, this nuclearization is detrimental to a young boy's socialisation since the mothers do not know how to exercise their new maternal responsibility leading to the boy looking for support from older generations. Yet these elders cannot help the child as this would transgress the new social changes, overall increasing intergenerational tensions and consequently leaving the boy with deep feelings of neglect.

=== A form of self-expression ===
Historical accounts of Truk island, according to Hezel, show that it is culturally acceptable for the young to have an indifference towards death and a 'fascination' of self-harm as proof of love for another. These ideas are likely to be driven by a Traditional Anomie Hypothesis which describes how the younger generation looks to reject old cultural values thereby putting an emphasis on peer social influence and this new 'young' idea of indifference towards death. As the theory states, this rejection of traditional values puts a greater emphasis on individual freedom rather than respect for others. Arguably, by committing suicide, the victim is communicating with their family, asking to reconcile and accept them for their new way of expressing themselves.

== Additional theories ==
=== Suicide as an Imitation ===
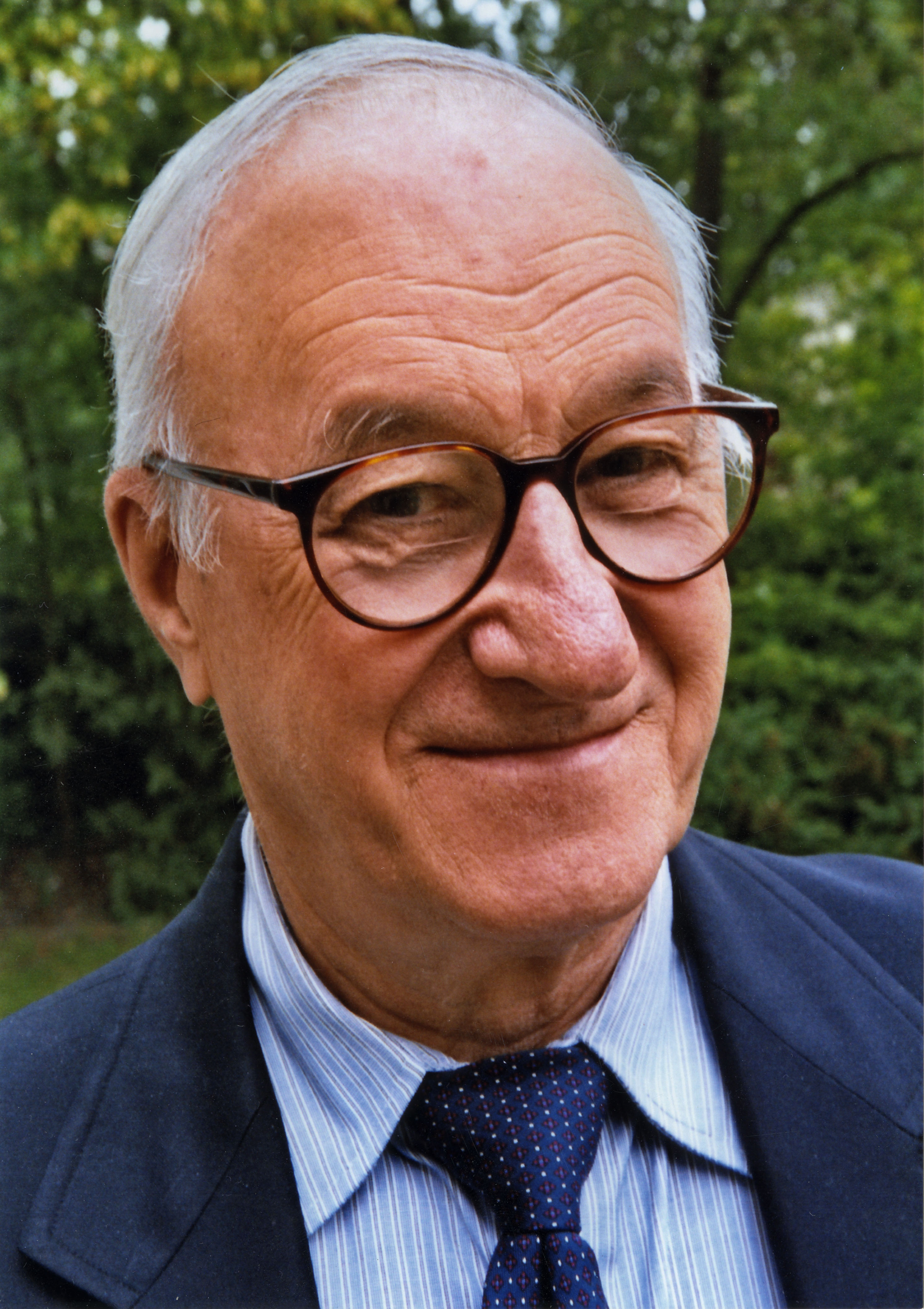
Albert Bandura, proposed the theory of Social Modelling

In explaining the sudden acceleration of cases, a 'contagion theory' by David Phillips can be used to show how suicide is contagious and the more publicized a suicide is or the more similar a person is to the deceased, there is a greater likelihood that that suicide will be imitated. Off the back of Albert Bandura's Social Learning Theory, Phillips suggests, by examining a series of follow up suicides after the deaths of famous actors, that race is a key factor in whether a person will model a suicide. This theory can help explain why cases are frequently male and between the ages of 15 and 24 years old.

=== A form of protest ===
As opposed to the optimistic theories of self-expression, it has also been considered that the victim commits suicide as a form of angry protest. Originally proposed by Rubinstein this theory has been backed up by research suggesting anger towards a loved one was usually a mitigating factor in a suicide. This emotional reaction can also be seen as a cry for help, 'faking' how much they are affected by the domestic conflict in order to appear worse than they really are. However this theory has been rebutted by Rubinstein's partner in research suggesting it was not 'blind rage' that motivated a suicide but an attempt at reconciliation.

==== Mental disorders ====
Only 10% of suicides in Micronesia have been linked with psychiatric disorders. With a sparse amount of research on any medical prognosis of these deaths, it is difficult to confidently suggest that these deaths are due to a collective, culturally inherited impairment of cognitive functions.

== Prevention attempts ==
What is common for modern research to suggest is actual prevention techniques that look to reduce suicides. One technique that has been suggested is the use of surveillance over the inhabitants of each island. Research on the effects of surveillance is lacking due to the papers consistently suggesting how suicide can be prevented instead of observational experiments on the impact of surveillance.
