= Male genital disease =

- Specialty: Urology

A male genital disease is a condition that affects the male reproductive system. The human male genitals consist of testicles and epididymides, ductus deferentes, seminal vesicles and ejaculatory ducts, prostate, bulbourethral glands, and penis.

== Classification by type of disease ==
=== Infection ===
==== Aetiological agents ====
===== Bacterial =====
- Erythrasma
- Balanoposthitis
- Fournier's Gangrene

===== Fungus =====
- Candidiasis
- Tinea cruris

===== Parasites =====
- Cutaneous larva migrans
- Pubic lice
- Scabies
- Tick

===== Virus =====
- Molluscum contagiosum
- Herpes: simplex, zoster

=== Cancers ===
The probability of contracting a cancerous development depends on age, ethnicity and the existence, or non-existence, of environmental causation. Unlike all other genitally situated cancers, the incidence of penis cancer is related to the sexual mode of transmission.

=== Inflammation ===
An example of a male genital disease is orchitis.

== Classification by location of disease ==
=== Penis ===
- Mondor's disease is a non-common disease
- Peyronie's disease is diagnosed when there is evidence of scar tissue formation within the tunica albuginea, tissue which contributes to the maintenance of the erectile state

=== Prostate ===
The three most statistically frequently occurring diseases of the prostate gland are benign hyperplasia (a swelling of the gland, not due to cancerous accumulation), prostatitis (inflammation), and cancer (which is the accumulation of malignant cells in the gland).

== See also ==
Female genital disease
