= Female genital disease =

Disorder of the structure or function of the female reproductive system

- Specialty: Gynaecology

Female genital disease is a disorder of the structure or function of the female reproductive system that has a known cause and a distinctive group of symptoms, signs, or anatomical changes. The female reproductive system consists of the ovaries, fallopian tubes, uterus, vagina, and vulva. Female genital diseases can be classified by affected location or by type of disease, such as malformation, inflammation, or infection.

== Diagnosis ==
Female genital diseases are usually diagnosed by healthcare personnel in a healthcare setting. Diagnosis may be made using laboratory tests, physical examinations, and/or clinical signs and symptoms.

=== Barriers to diagnosis ===
Historically, discussions surrounding feminine reproductive and sexual health have been subject to social stigma within Western society. Women in Western society may avoid discussing problems relating to the female reproductive system, including problems related to female sexual health, with their healthcare providers. As a result, diagnosis of female genital diseases may be delayed or missed. Social determinants of health including economic and logistical burden of seeking healthcare may also interfere with timely diagnosis of female genital disease.

=== Gender considerations ===
Individuals who have female genitals and/or reproductive organs but who do not identify as women may experience additional difficulties in seeking diagnosis of female genital diseases. Societal discrimination, gender dysphoria, and insufficient transgender healthcare education are some reasons that transgender individuals may be unable to obtain medical care for female genital diseases.

== Women's history in clinical trials ==
Medical professionals use a variety of resources that assist them in creating clinical decisions in providing care to the population, with one of the more utilized sources are known as clinical trials. Clinical trials are used to analyze the efficacy and safety of medications, medical intervention, and medical procedures. Historically, women representation in clinical trials has been suboptimal, oftentimes being excluded from trials due to "potential maternal-fetal liability", "have less experience, and are more costly to engage". However, through limiting the number of women eligible for various stages of these trials, outcomes and the burden of disease have been underrepresented in females, either underreported or not adjusted for. For example, due to the fact that women have different drug efficacies and safety profiles to men, it is estimated "in 2005 that eight out of ten prescription drugs were withdrawn from the US market because of women's health issues". Clinical trials that focused on preventative care, such as screenings, diagnostics, and health services in have an adjusted relative difference of 8.48% in female enrollment. Fortunately, over the years we have seen a rise in women participants, with an average of 60.0% females enrolled in clinical trials in 2018, up 18.9% from the lowest year of participants, in 2002, with a median of 41.1%.

Therefore, as we diminish the number of women who are a part of clinical trials, then guidelines that are used by medical professional stem majority from male subjects; this can then led into a variety of other factors to consider when making medical decisions towards women in the acute inpatient or chronic ambulatory care setting such as social and financial difference that can impact the care women receive. Importantly so, we decrease the number of studies that are geared towards women's reproductive issues, such as genital disease. In efforts to encourage women to participate in clinical research, the National Institute of Health (NIH) launched the women's health initiative in 1991 that focuses clinical trials and observational studies on post-menopausal women over a 15 year period of time. Additionally, by broadening what "women's health" encompasses, including not only reproductive and genital health, childbearing, and menstruation but also osteoporosis, breast cancer, and other disease states where women bear higher burden than men, the NIH can focus funding on these conditions.

== Perception ==
In society, having a disease related to a person's genitalia continues to be a stigma today. The stigma comes with shame and embarrassment that is not only internalized, but also emphasized by others through loss of support and discrimination. Some of that shame is rooted in spirituality and societal perception. In a study done in Lagos, Nigeria regarding uterine fibroids, majority of the women who participated in the study (67.0%) "perceived [uterine] fibroids as a spiritual problem" and believe that the best course of treatment is done spiritually through places of worship such as churches and mosques. The majority of women who participated in the study knew that uterine fibroids existed and were associated with obesity. In both developed and developing countries, individuals with female genital diseases experience shame through perception of these diseases by healthcare providers and the general public. In a multisite study in the United States focusing on English and Spanish speaking women regarding perception, knowledge, and experiences with vaginal prolapse, these women had feelings of shame regarding their condition since they blamed themselves for their condition and felt that their condition was "unnatural or less like a woman". One woman mentioned that they were humiliated by a physician for their condition. Given the stigma regarding genital diseases, a common theme from the participants was that they did not know that vaginal prolapse can occur in women. Another study in India was done where researchers called people recently diagnosed with sexually transmitted infections regarding the stigma towards their condition. Researchers found that 49 out of 487 people wanted to participate in their study, which they inferred was related to the "shame and stigma in the Indian population".

== Classification by type of disease ==
=== Malformation ===
Malformations can be congenital. They are classified by location of the malformation, such as uterine malformation.

=== Inflammation or infection ===
Inflammation of the female vulva or vagina is called vaginitis. Another example is oophoritis or vulvovaginal candidiasis, which is also known as a yeast infection, is extremely common and caused by the bacteria found naturally populating the vagina (the vaginal flora) i.e. Candida albicans.

=== Cancers ===
Cancers of the female internal genitalia (such as ovarian cancer) and vulva are not uncommon.

== Classification by location ==
=== Diseases of the vulva ===
==== Bartholin's cyst ====
A Bartholin's cyst is an abscess of a Bartholin's gland. Bartholin's glands are located within the labia, or the skin folds surrounding the vaginal opening. Bartholin's cysts can be painful and may require drainage or surgical removal in order to resolve.

==== Vulvodynia ====
Vulvodynia is a chronic pain condition which involves the sensation of pain in the area surrounding the vaginal opening in response to physical stimulation such as vaginal penetration. This condition can be distressing to people who have it as it can interfere with intimacy. There is no standardized treatment for vulvodynia, but some options include pelvic floor physical therapy and pharmacologic pain management.

=== Disease of the vagina ===
==== Vaginal prolapse ====
Vaginal prolapse, otherwise known as pelvic organ prolapse, is when a person's vagina descends due to pelvic organ pressure or due to tissue injury and/or muscle weakness. Some of the risk factors include previous pelvic surgeries as well as activities and conditions that increase intrabdominal pressure such as childbirth, obesity, and older age. Symptoms of vaginal prolapse are vaginal bulge, urinary and fecal incontinence, and sexual dysfunction. Treatment for vaginal prolapse can be either conservative or surgical according to Kapoor et al. Some of the conservative treatments include Kegel exercises that strengthen the pelvic floor and pessaries which aim to put the vagina in a normal position. Surgical treatment options include colpocleisis, vaginal reconstruction, and abdominal sacrocolpopexy. Colpocleisis is an obliterative procedure that would remove the possibility of vaginal intercourse. Therefore, a person's desire to get pregnant is considered when deciding treatment for this condition.

==== Bacterial vaginosis ====
Bacterial vaginosis is a condition that occurs when there is an overgrowth of normal bacteria in the vagina. The community of bacteria that normally exists in the vagina is called the vaginal flora. The flora serves as a defense against the invasion and colonization of opportunistic pathogens including bacterial vaginosis, fungi, viruses, and protozoa. Historically, it was believed that the bacterium Gardnerella caused bacterial vaginosis, but studies have shown that bacterial vaginosis can be caused by a variety of bacteria. Women are at an increased risk of having bacterial vaginosis if they smoke cigarettes, recently used antibiotics, use an intrauterine device, have multiple sexual partners, and practice vaginal douching.

==== Trichomoniasis ====
Trichomoniasis, also known as "trich", is a sexually transmitted infection caused by a protozoan parasite called trichomonas vaginalis. It is the most common protozoal infection in the United States. This motile organism is not exclusive to women, but can also be found in the prostate and urethra of men. Individuals are at an increased risk of contracting trich if they have a history of sexually transmitted infections, have new or multiple sex partners, abuse IV drugs, and do not use any type of protection during sex.

=== Disease of the cervix ===
==== Cervicitis ====
Cervicitis is inflammation of the cervix in individuals with a uterus, most commonly identified in those presenting as women. While some patients report pus and mucus like discharge, a majority of individuals with this condition do not present with any symptoms. Less than half of the cases of cervicitis are linked to either Neisseria gonorrhoeae or Chlamydia trachomatis, likely sexually transmitted. However, more than half have unknown infectious etiology. Complications can result in pelvic inflammatory disease, difficulties bearing pregnancy, and endometriosis. Due to these adverse outcomes, the CDC recommends that women undergo routine nucleic acid amplification technique (NAAT) testing, which can aid in the detection of chlamydia and gonorrhea.

=== Diseases of the uterus ===
==== Uterine malformation ====
Uterine malformations are sometimes referred to as congenital uterine anomalies. A uterine malformation is an abnormality in the development of a person's uterus. This condition can result in fertility problems such as increased risk of miscarriage.

==== Uterine fibroids ====
Uterine fibroids, also known as uterine leiomyomas, are solid growths of noncancerous smooth muscle cells that are located on the uterus. There is no cause, but risk factors such as family history, reproductive issues, hormones, and viruses are associated with fibroid growth. Previous research suggested an association between diet and hormonal changes that has the potential to form fibroids and give them the environment to grow. Despite other research contradicting this statement, further research stated that low fruit and vegetable intake as well as Vitamin D insufficiency and food contaminants have been correlated to fibroid formation and growth. In most cases, uterine fibroids are asymptomatic and therefore will not need treatment. Giuliani et al. found that asymptomatic uterine fibroids are present in 70% of individuals who were diagnosed with it, suggesting that it plays a role in epidemiologic studies underestimating its prevalence. Uterine fibroids are treated if the person is experiencing symptoms such as anemia, infertility, and pelvic and back pain. These treatments aim to decrease the uterine fibroid size, prevent their growth, and improve symptoms the person deals with. Treatments that are currently being used to treat uterine fibroids are medications, surgeries such as hysteroscopy and laparoscopy, and radiologic treatments such as radiofrequency ablation. Most of these treatments affect a person's ability to get pregnant.

==== Endometriosis ====
Endometriosis is when a person has their uterine endometrial tissue that is growing somewhere besides its normal location, most commonly at the pelvic peritoneum. This can also be regarded as "lesions outside of the uterus". This condition has been described as "benign and estrogen dependent", therefore impacting those who produce estrogen. Other locations where this may occur, although more rare, include ovaries, pericardium, rectovaginal septum, bladder, and more. Most commonly, this can be associated with pelvic pain and infertility.

=== Diseases of the fallopian tubes ===
==== Salpingitis ====
Salpingitis, or salpingitis isthmica nodosa, is a disease involving inflammation within the fallopian tubes. This condition can be caused by infections, such as sexually transmitted infections. Salpingitis may be associated with fertility problems, such as infertility and ectopic pregnancy.

==== Ectopic pregnancy ====
Ectopic pregnancy, or tubal ectopic pregnancy, is a condition that occurs when a developing pregnancy implants outside of the uterus, such as in the fallopian tubes. This condition is an emergency and can be fatal to the pregnant person. Treatment usually involves a salpingectomy, or the removal of the affected fallopian tube.

=== Diseases of the ovaries ===
==== Oophoritis ====
Oophoritis is a condition affecting one or both of the ovaries which results in inflammation. Oophoritis can be caused by an infection or by an autoimmune disease called primary ovarian insufficiency.

== Sexually transmitted infections ==
A sexually transmitted infection (STI) is an infection caused by a virus, fungus, bacteria, or parasite that is spread through sexual contact. STIs are very common and can be passed from one person to another through vaginal, oral, and anal sex.

=== Complications ===
Sexually transmitted infections can impact female reproductive health worldwide. Women experience a larger impact on their health compared to men because of how exposed and vulnerable their urogenital anatomy is. The vaginal mucosa is thin and can be easily penetrated by infectious agents. Some complications that women experience from STIs are infertility, chronic pelvic pain, increased peripartum morbidity, and increased peripartum mortality.

=== Economic burden ===
In 2018, $15.9 billion was spent on lifetime medical cost attributable to STIs such as chlamydia, trichomoniasis, gonorrhea, genital herpes, syphilis, human papillomavirus (HPV), HIV, and hepatitis B. When HIV is not included in the cost, STIs in women account for about three fourths of lifetime direct medical costs annually.

== See also ==
- Male genital disease
