= Hostile abdomen =

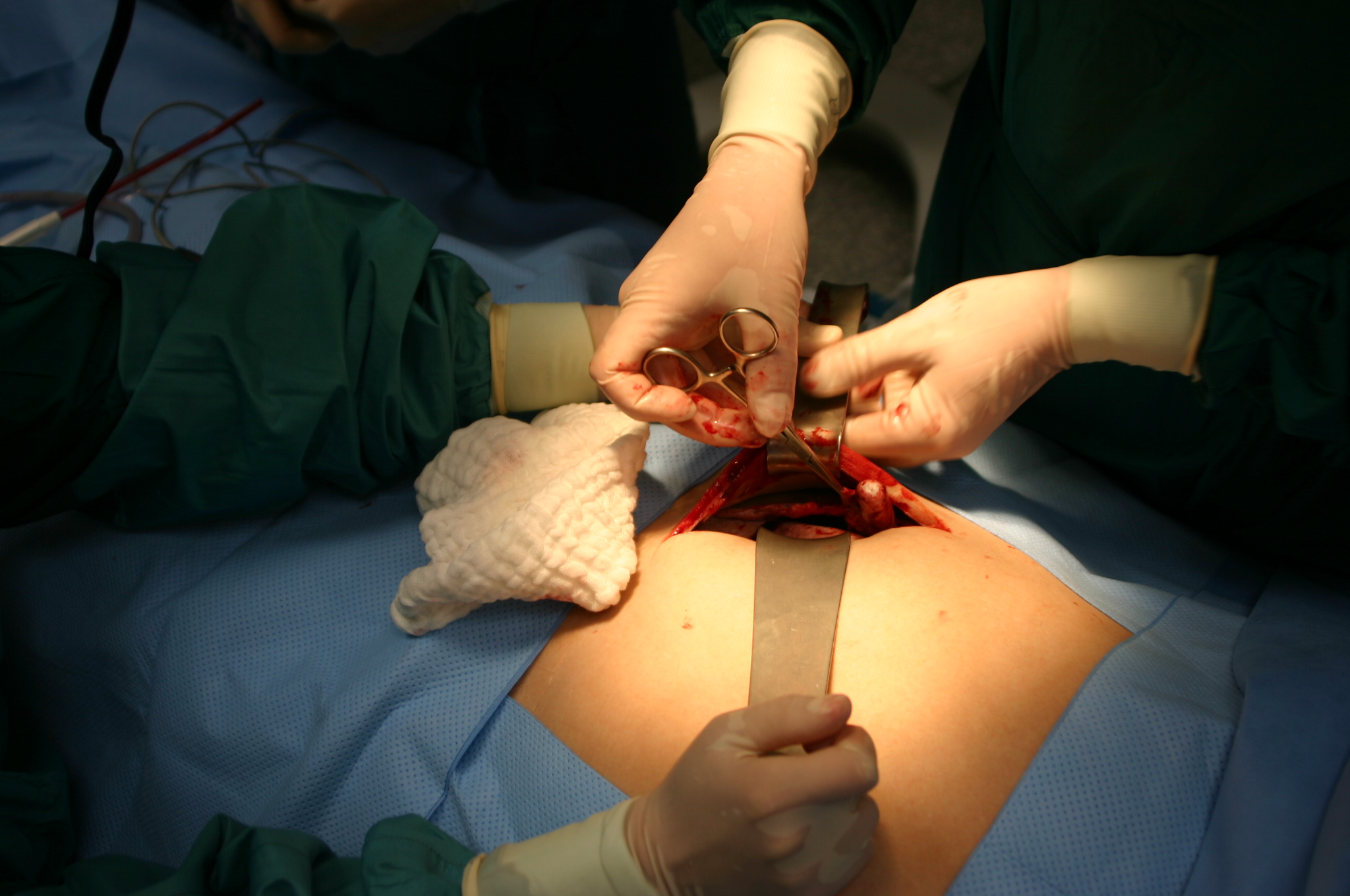
- Surgical interventions involved in the management of hostile abdomen
- Specialty: Gastroenterology
- Symptoms: Chronic abdominal pain; bowel obstruction; limited abdominal wall compliance
- Complications: intra-abdominal infections; anastomotic leak; incisonal hermia
- Causes: peritoneal injury; infections; endometriosis; surgery; radiation; peritoneal dialysis
- Diagnostic method: Medical history; Imaging studies; Laparoscopy; Physical examination
- Prevention: Non-surgical management; Adhesion barriers; Adhesiolysis; Bowel resection; Abdominal wall reconstruction
- Medication: corticosteroids; analgesics

Hostile abdomen, a complex clinical condition, is characterized by excessive fibrous adhesions and scarring in the abdominal cavity, often resulting from previous surgeries or inflammatory disorders. Hostile abdomen can lead to significant complications such as chronic abdominal pain, bowel obstruction, and prolonged recovery times following surgical interventions. Common symptoms include limited abdominal wall compliance and fragile intestinal tissue, which may contribute to complications. Short-term complications may arise shortly after surgery, including intra-abdominal infections and bowel fistulas, while long-term issues can involve chronic bowel obstruction and incisional hernia. The diagnosis for hostile abdomen typically requires a combination of medical history, physical examination, and imaging techniques, with intra-operative assessments often confirming the presence of adhesions.

Management strategies aim to reduce adhesion formation and address complications through both non-surgical and surgical approaches. A thorough understanding of the underlying causes, including organic and iatrogenic factors, is essential for prevention and management of hostile abdomen.

== Signs and symptoms ==
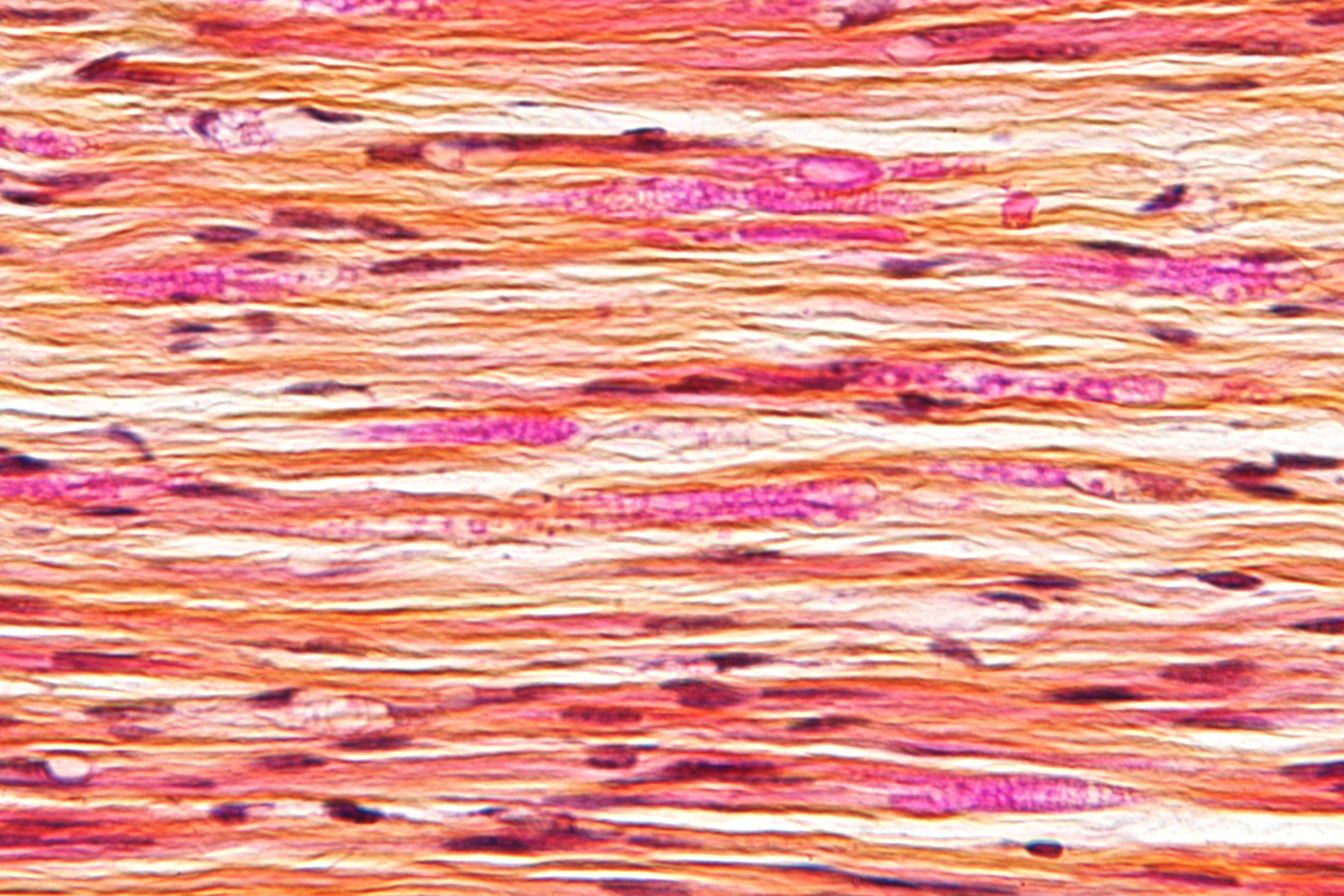
This picture illustrates the histological features of a thickening and fibrotic abdominal sample.

Common symptoms and complications associated with a hostile abdomen include limited abdominal wall compliance and peritoneal fibrosis or thickening. These conditions can lead to significant issues. For instance, adhesions from previous surgeries can lead to tension or obstruction, resulting in chronic or recurrent abdominal pain. Additionally, intestinal tissue may appear fragile and delicate, often scarred and thickened into a solid mass.

Short-term complications typically arise within days to weeks of post-surgery. One major issue is intra-abdominal sepsis, which can significantly prolong recovery. Moreover, bowel obstruction may arise from adhesions, requiring immediate intervention. Another serious concern is fluid buildup at the surgical connections between segments of the bowel. Furthermore, bowel fistulas, or abnormal connections that form between different parts of the bowel, are also common short-term complications that require prolonged treatment and increase hospital stays. Unintentional enterotomy, or accidental cutting into the bowel during surgery, poses an increased acute risk. These complications collectively increase surgical risk, prolong operating times, and exacerbate blood loss.

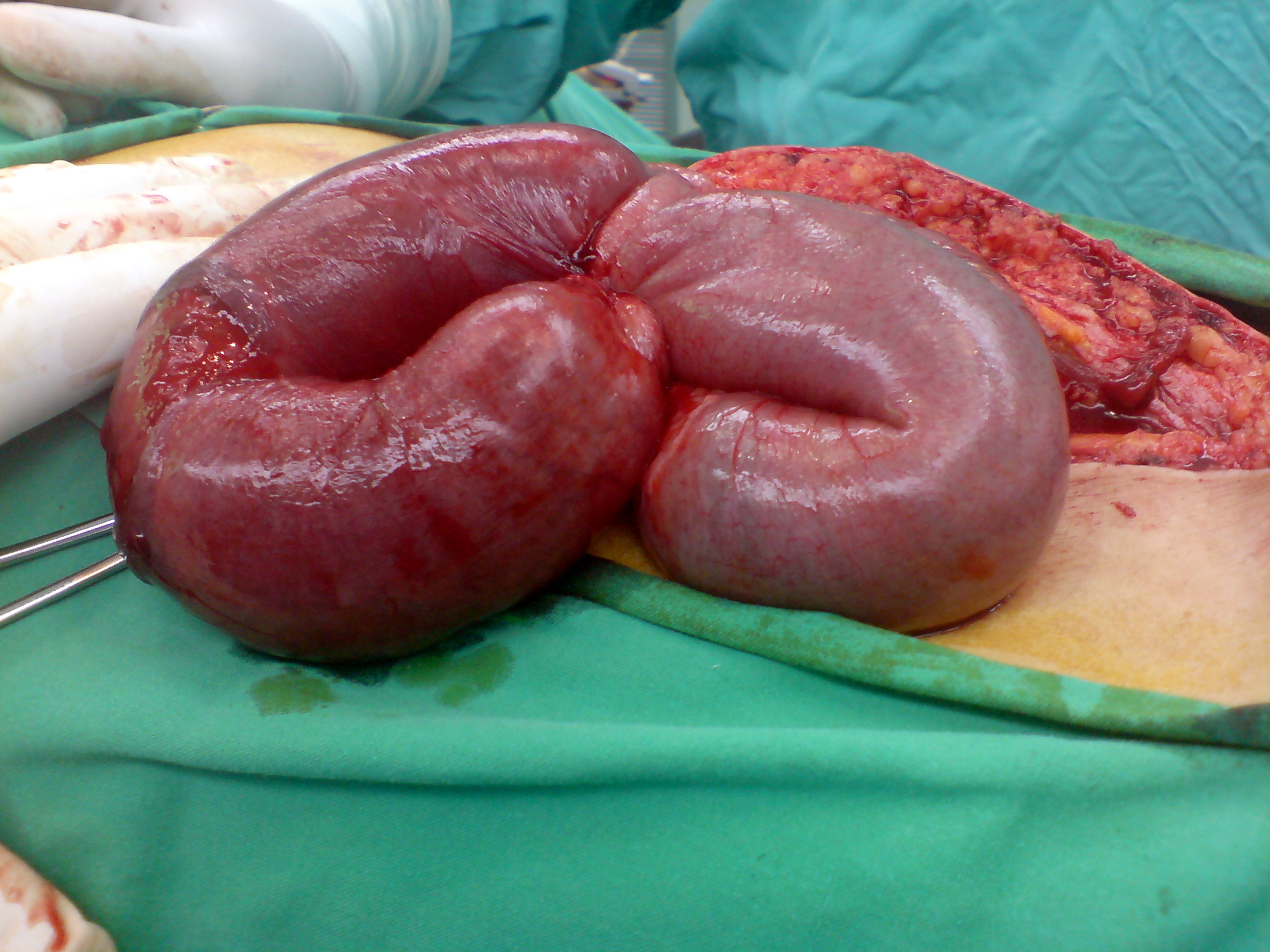
An individual experiencing severe bowel obstruction as a result of her previous appendectomy surgery.

Long-term complications may include bowel obstruction, persistent sepsis, incisional hernia, and short bowel syndrome due to significant bowel resection. Individuals with a hostile abdomen frequently experience a longer and more complicated recovery process compared to standard cases. Overall, while some individuals may remain asymptomatic, others can experience severe symptoms such as bowel strangulation or ischemia.

== Causes ==
The causes of hostile abdomen can be broadly categorised into organic and iatrogenic factors. Organic causes primarily involve conditions that directly affect the peritoneum, while iatrogenic causes are primarily related to medical interventions.

=== Organic causes ===
==== Peritoneal injury and inflammation ====
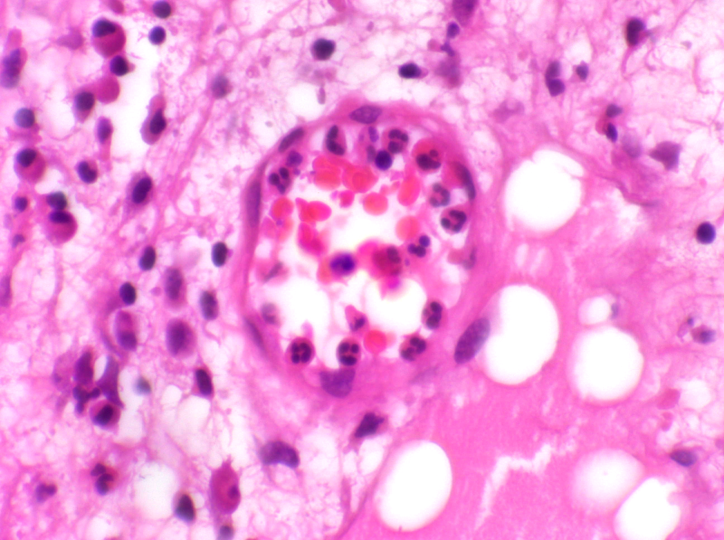
An illustration of neutrophils under inflammation, which further stimulates fibrous adhesions.

Peritoneal injury and inflammation are prevalent in individuals with peritoneal inflammatory disorders such as peritonitis and Crohn's disease. Inflammatory responses may trigger excessive fibrin disposition, increasing the risk of hostile abdomen.

==== Intra-abdominal infections ====
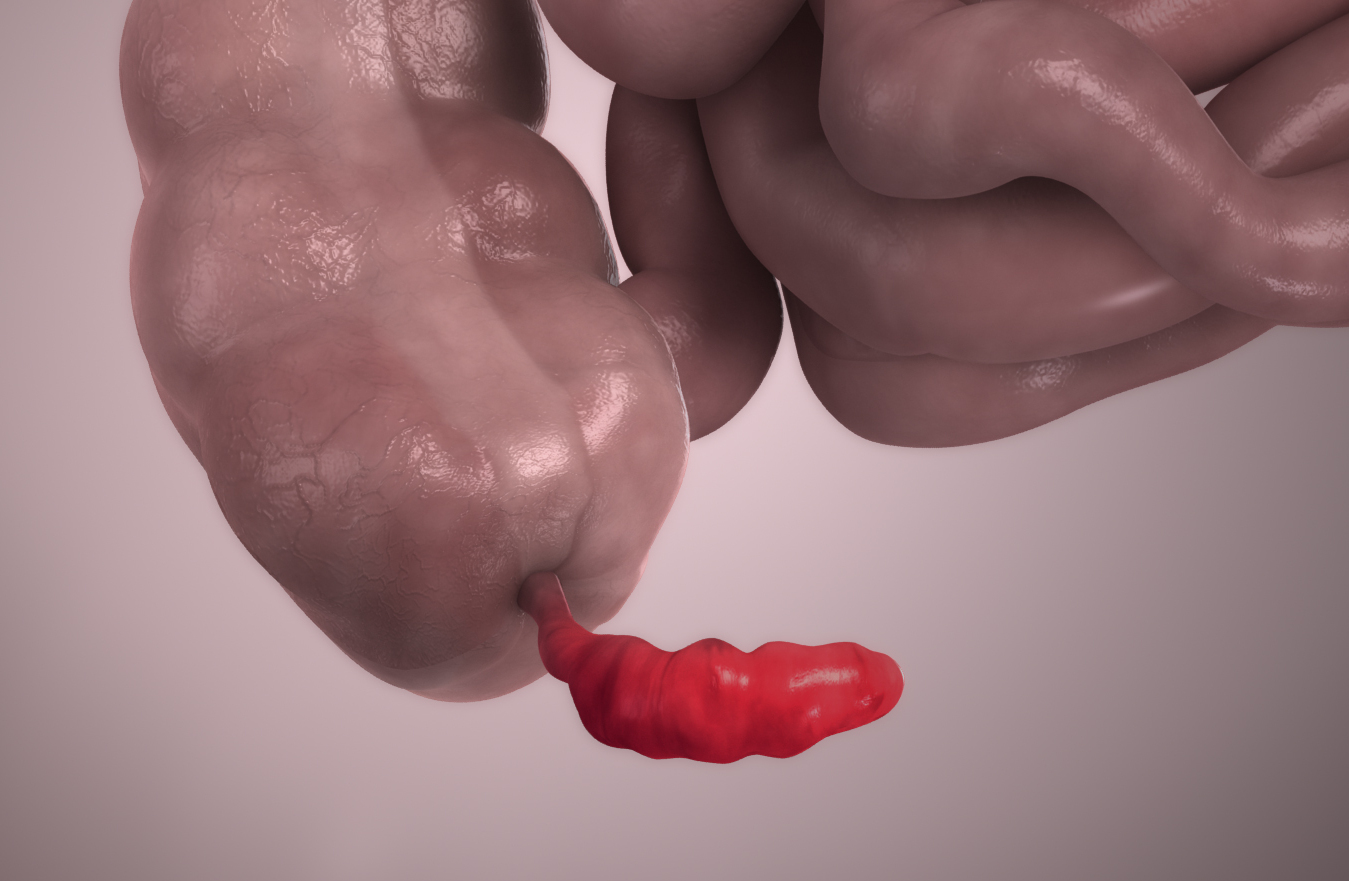
Appendicitis occurs due to inflammation in the appendix. It often causes abdominal pain, nausea, vomiting, and requires surgical removal for treatment.

Intra-abdominal infections in conditions like acute appendicitis and abdominal tuberculosis significantly contribute to hostile abdomen. These infections triggers the release of Inflammatory cytokines and increase vascular permeability, leading to fibrin deposition that exacerbates the risk of developing hostile abdomen.

==== Endometriosis ====
Endometriosis occurs when endometrial-like tissue develops outside the uterus, leading to pelvic pain and inflammation.

Endometriosis involves the growth of tissue similar to the endometrium outside the uterus, causing pelvic pain and inflammation. This abnormal tissue growth results in scarred fibrotic tissues and smooth muscle proliferation near lesions, leading to peritoneal adhesions that complicate surgical procedures. Common injury sites due to endometriosis include the ovarian cyst wall, rectum, and vagina.

=== Iatrogenic causes ===
==== Surgery-induced adhesions ====
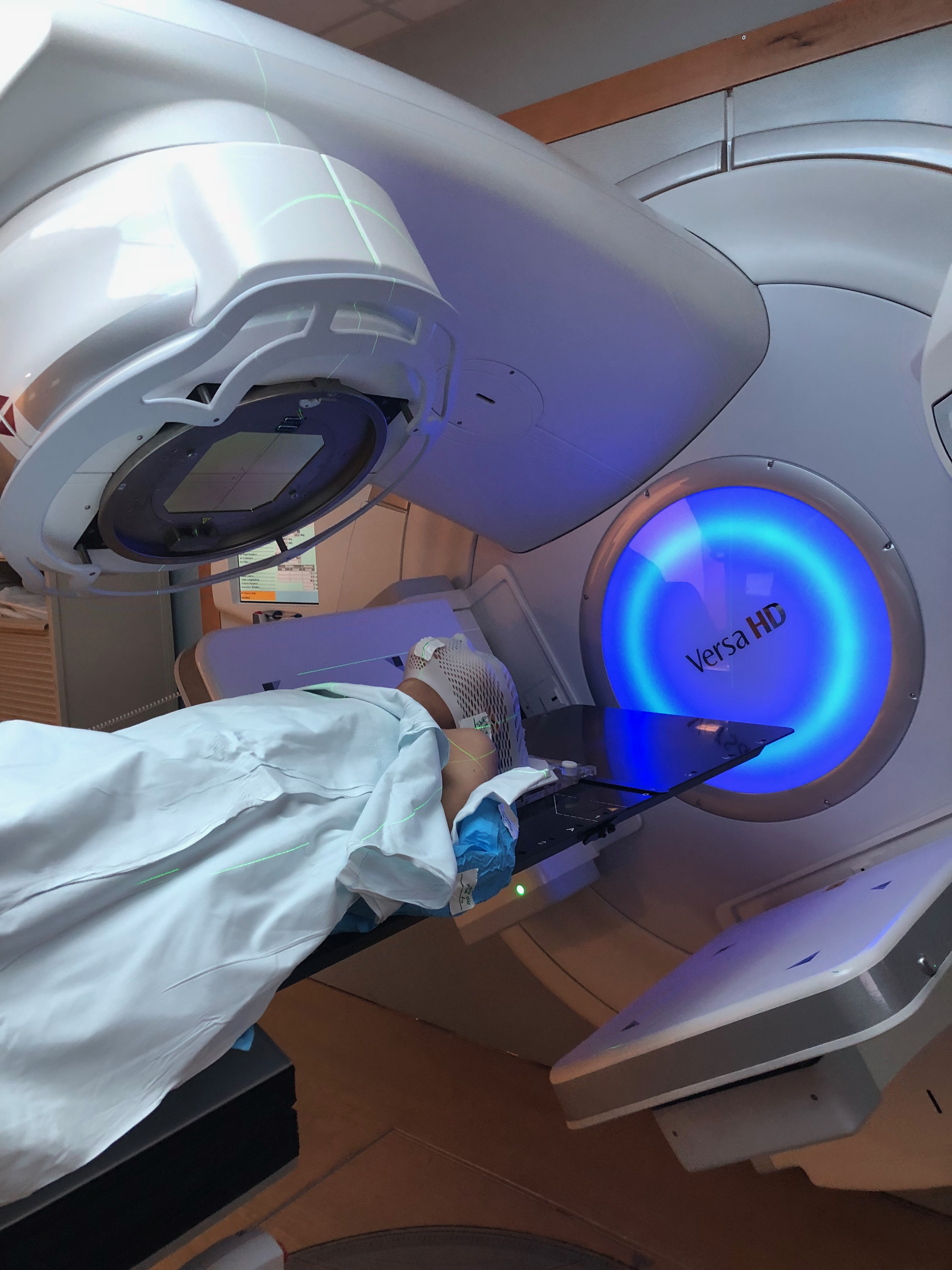
Common radiation therapy techniques include external beam radiotherapy which makes use of a linear accelerator.

Surgical adhesions account for over 90% of cases linked to prior surgeries. Procedures such as appendicectomy and large bowel resections can cause tissue trauma, activating a healing response that forms adhesions and scar tissue. The likelihood of adhesion development increases with the number of surgical interventions an individual undergoes.

==== Radiation therapy ====
Radiation therapy, widely used in treating malignancies like gynecological diseases, can lead to extensive intra-abdominal adhesions and radiation-induced fibrosis. Improper radiation doses or incorrect targeting of body regions can exacerbate the risk of injury, particularly in the large intestine near the cecum.

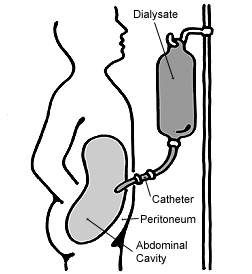
Peritoneal dialysis uses the peritoneum as a membrane to filter waste from the blood with the aid of a catheter.

==== Peritoneal dialysis (PD) ====
Peritoneal dialysis is a technique commonly used on individuals with chronic kidney disease. However, it could lead to complications like infections (e.g. peritonitis) or gastrointestinal perforation. These conditions accelerate adhesion formation and may result in intestinal obstruction, potentially leading to encapsulating peritoneal sclerosis, which increases the risk of fibrotic tissue deposition in abdominal organs.

An immune response is often triggered when antigen binds to the surface receptor of antigen-presenting cell.

==== Foreign body reactions ====
Foreign body reactions can be caused by surgical materials, such as mesh implants used in hernia repairs. Foreign body reactions can trigger inflammation and wound-healing responses. These reactions contribute to the formation of fibrotic adhesion.

== Pathophysiology ==
The pathophysiology of hostile abdomen primarily involves a chronic inflammatory response, which may be naturally occurring or induced by treatment. This inflammation results in excessive production of scarred and fibrotic tissues from myofibroblasts, which is the activated form of fibroblast. Consequently, normal cellular architecture in the abdominal region is replaced by dense fibrotic tissues, leading to adhesion within abdominal organs.

=== Cytokine and chemokine signalling ===
Cytokines and chemokines, such as TGF-β, and interleukin like Interleukin-4 and Interleukin-13 have a central role in the inflammatory response. TGF-β promotes myofibroblast differentiation and inhibiting the degradation of the extracellular matrix. Moreover, Interleukin-4 and Interleukin-13 enhance extracellular matrix production and create a positive feedback loop that accelerating fibrotic response.

=== Imbalance immune responses ===
The immune response is characterized by two main pathways: Th1 and Th2 responses. Both pathways play opposing roles in fibrosis. The Th1 response, mediated by interferon gamma, promotes macrophage activation and inhibit fibrosis. In contrast, the Th2 response increases Interleukin-4 and Interleukin-13 production, driving fibrosis by myofibroblast activation. Chronic inflammation leads to prolonged Th2 response, resulting in excessive extracellular matrix formation and scarring, which perpetuates the fibrotic process.

=== Angiotensin ===
Angiotensin is a peptide hormone released during chronic inflammation, activates the Renin-angiotensin-aldosterone-system (RAAS). This hormone exacerbates inflammation and promotes fibrosis by inducing myofibroblast differentiation. As a result, angiotensin contributes to excess tissue damage and deposition of extracellular matrix.

== Diagnostic method ==
Diagnosing hostile abdomen relies on a combination of clinical assessments and imaging techniques. While the diagnosis is often confirmed during surgery, pre-operative suspicion plays a crucial role.

=== Pre-operative diagnosis ===
==== Medical history ====
A detailed medical history is essential for diagnosing hostile abdomen. This includes medical details about prior abdominal surgeries—such as the number, type, and any complications—as well as history of trauma, inflammatory bowel disease (like Crohn's disease), radiation therapy to the abdomen, and past abdominal infections or sepsis. The Hostile Abdomen Index (HAI) is a tool used to stratify risk preoperatively. Higher scores on the HAI correlate with an increased likelihood of hostile abdomen due to prior surgeries or complications.

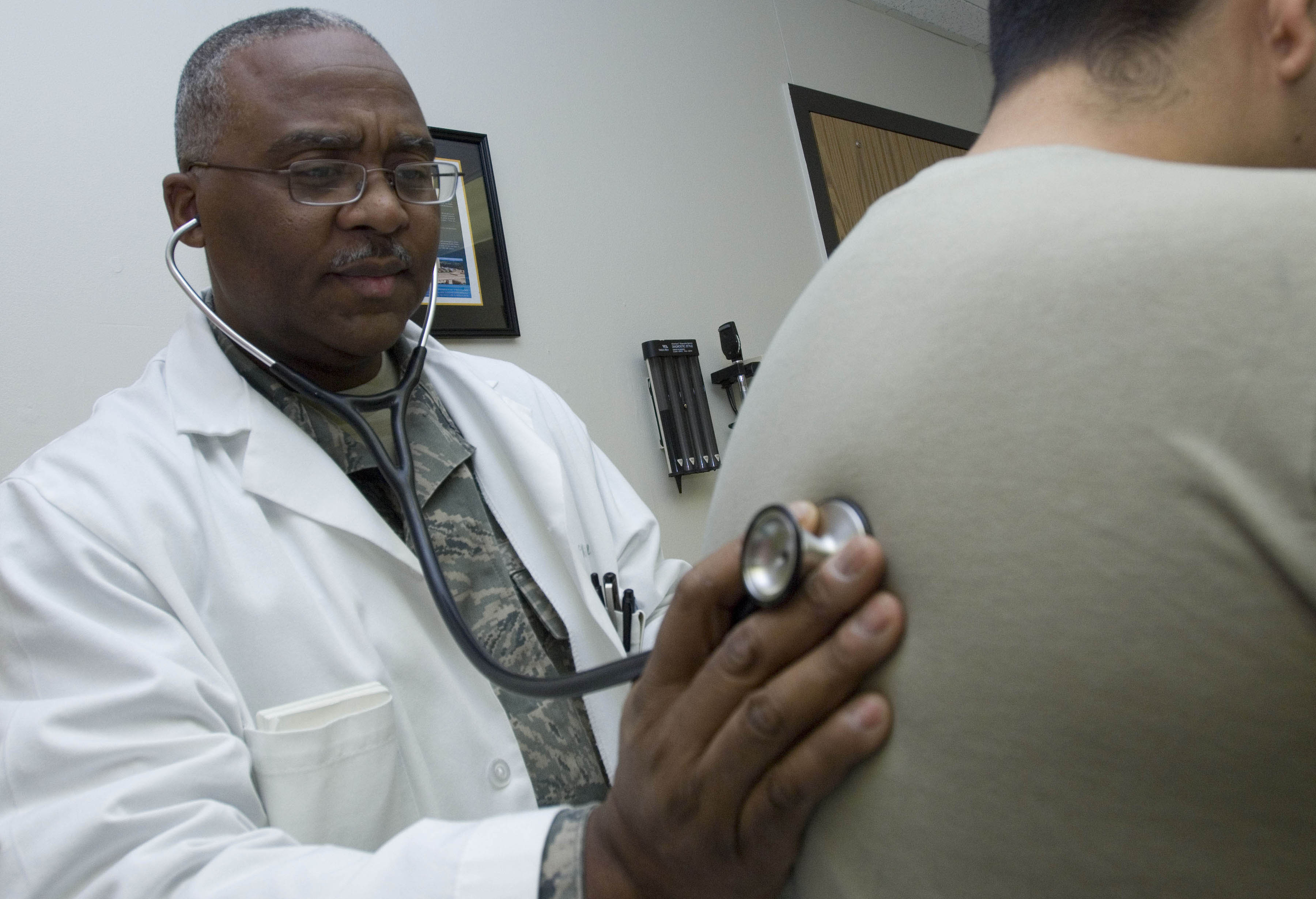
A stethoscope is used during physical examination

==== Physical examination ====
A physical examination may reveal signs of abdominal distension, tenderness, or guarding. However, these signs can be subtle or absent, especially in individuals with chronic conditions.

==== Imaging ====
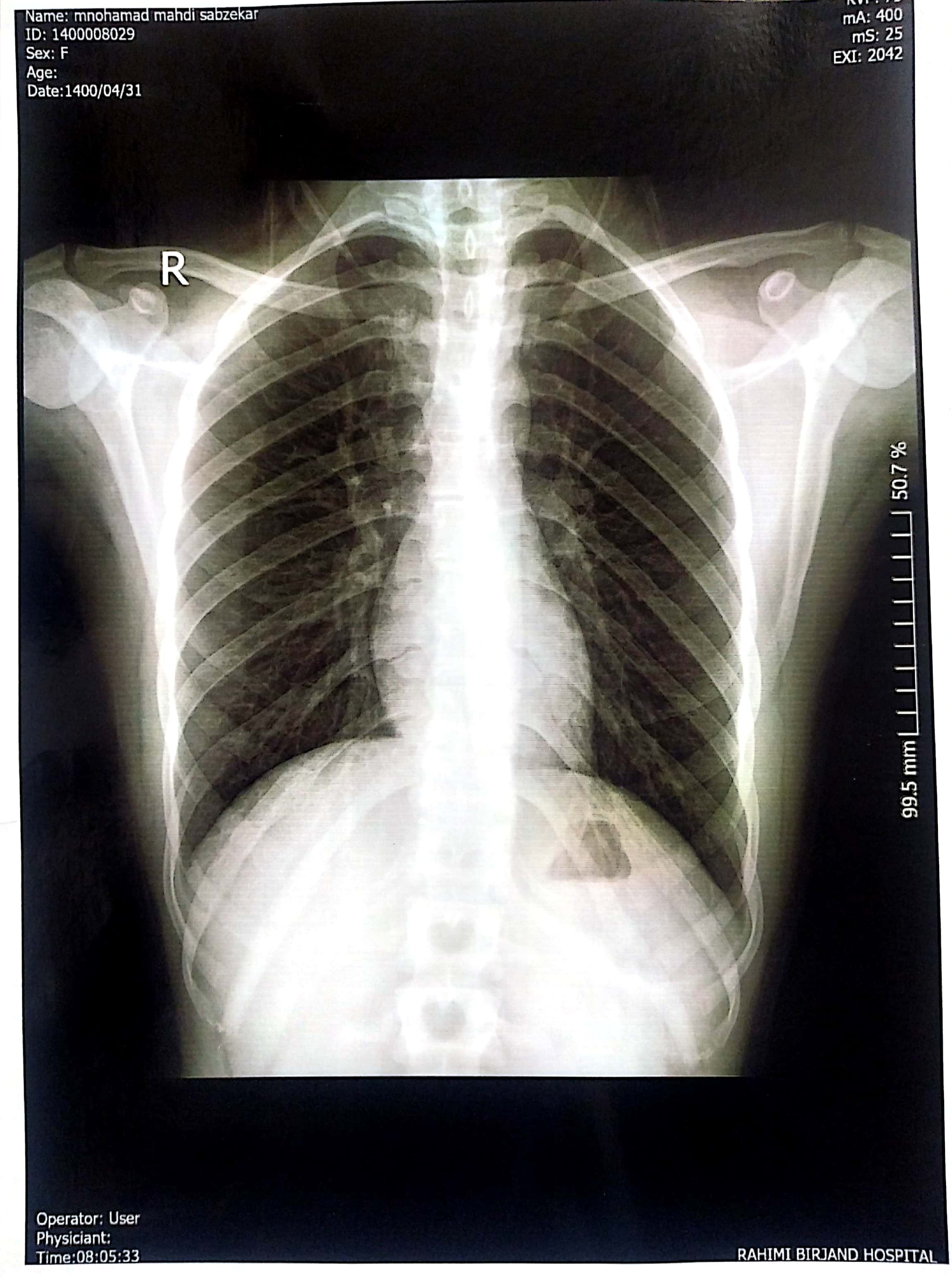
An X-ray imaging applied onto the individual's thoracic and abdominal cavity.

Imaging techniques like abdominal X-rays can reveal signs of bowel obstruction, such as air-fluid levels and enlarged intestinal loops. Furthermore, a CT scan with oral contrast provides more detailed information, including bowel wall thickening, mesenteric changes, stenosis, retractile mesenteritis, and calcification in severe cases. However, imaging may not reveal the full extent of adhesions or scarring due to lack of measurable indicators.

=== Intra-operative diagnosis ===
The needle-like laparoscope makes small cuts to visualise the abdominal content with the help of a micro-camera.

==== Laparoscopy ====
Laparoscopy involves inserting a laparoscope through small incisions to directly visualize the abdominal organs. Laparoscopy allows the assessment of adhesions, inflammation, abscesses, or other abnormalities characteristic of a hostile abdomen. This visual inspection provides crucial information that cannot be fully obtained from pre-operative imaging.

==== Open exploration ====
Open exploration is performed when laparoscopy is not feasible or if significant pathology is suspected. This surgical approach enables clear visualisation and manipulation of the abdominal structure.

== Prevention ==
To prevent the development of a hostile abdomen, there are three main strategies used which focus on reducing peritoneal adhesion formation.

=== Minimally invasive surgery ===
Minimally invasive surgery employs techniques such as laparoscopic and robot-assisted surgery. These methods involve making small incisions to access abdominal and pelvic organs with the aid of a 3D high-resolution camera. Minimally invasive surgery can reduce peritoneal trauma and the likelihood of adhesion formation.

=== Adhesion barriers ===
Adhesion barrier materials, such as Seprafilm, Hyalobarrier, SprayGel are used in abdominal laparotomy surgery to prevent adhesions. These materials can decrease the extent, incidence, and severity of adhesions. Moreover, ongoing development of new barriers aim to improve their effectiveness to further mitigate risks for hostile abdomen formation.

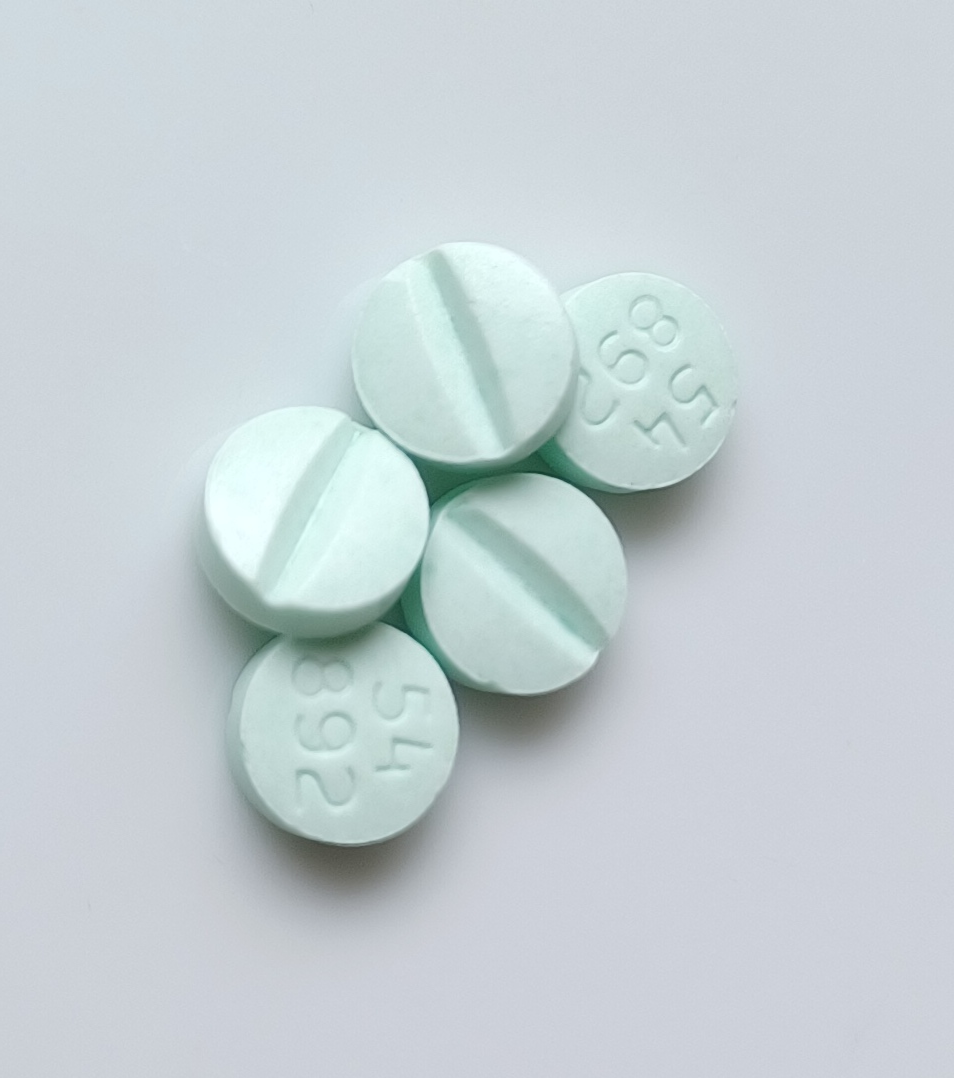
Corticosteroids, such as hydrocortisone and prednisolone

=== Anti-adhesion agents ===
Anti-adhesion agents, such as corticosteroids, can be used to reduce inflammation and prevent adhesion formation. However, their therapeutic efficacy is limited, making them less common in clinical practice for hostile abdomen prevention.

== Management ==
Hostile abdomen management depends on symptom severity and complications, and are categorised into non-surgical and surgical approaches.

=== Non-surgical management ===
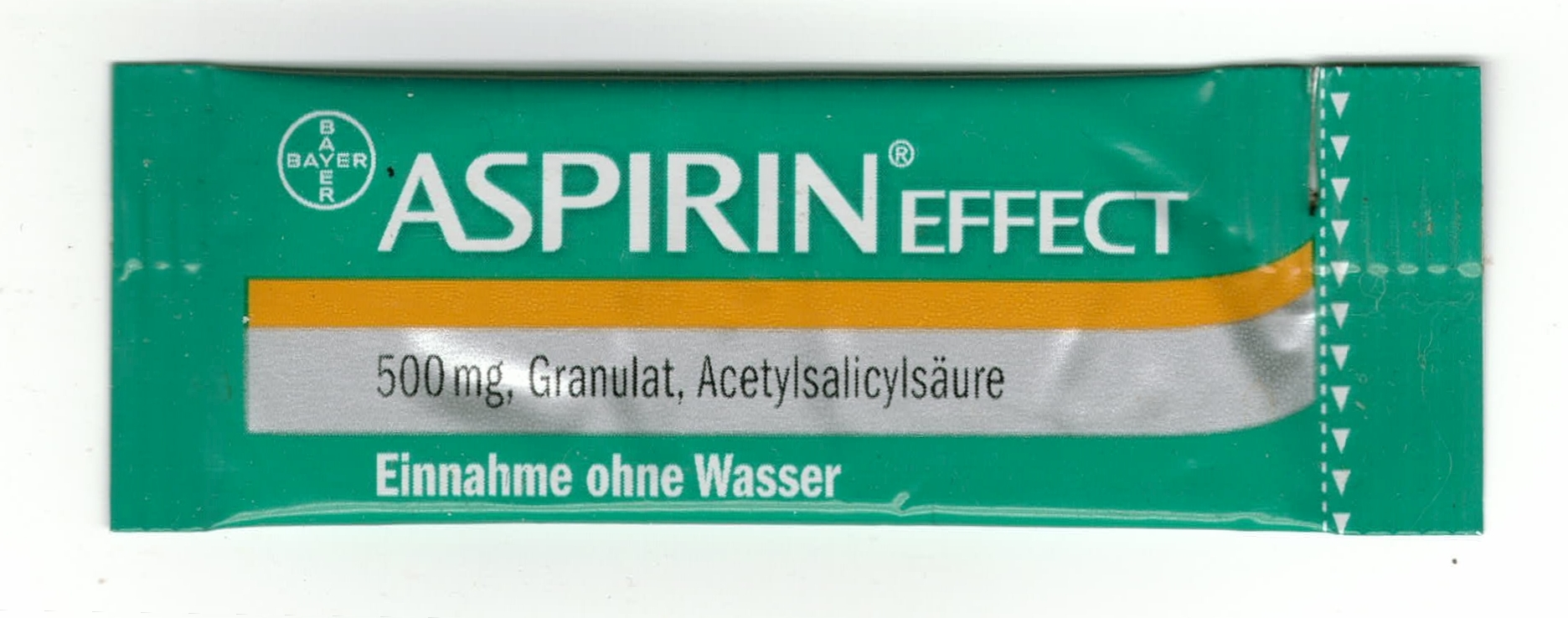
Analgesics is a class of drug used to relieve pain. Aspirin is an example of analgesics.

==== Conservative management ====
Conservative management focuses on symptom relief. This may include dietary modifications to improve digestion. Additionally, pain control by analgesics can help manage discomfort, while bowel-regulating agents, such as laxatives, are utilized to alleviate constipation.

==== Adhesion prevention therapy ====
Adhesion prevention therapy is a developing field aimed at preventing or reducing the formation of new adhesions after surgery. This therapy seeks to treat existing adhesions by inducing fibrinolysis. However, the efficacy and long-term impact of these therapies are still under evaluation, highlighting the need for ongoing research.

=== Surgical management ===
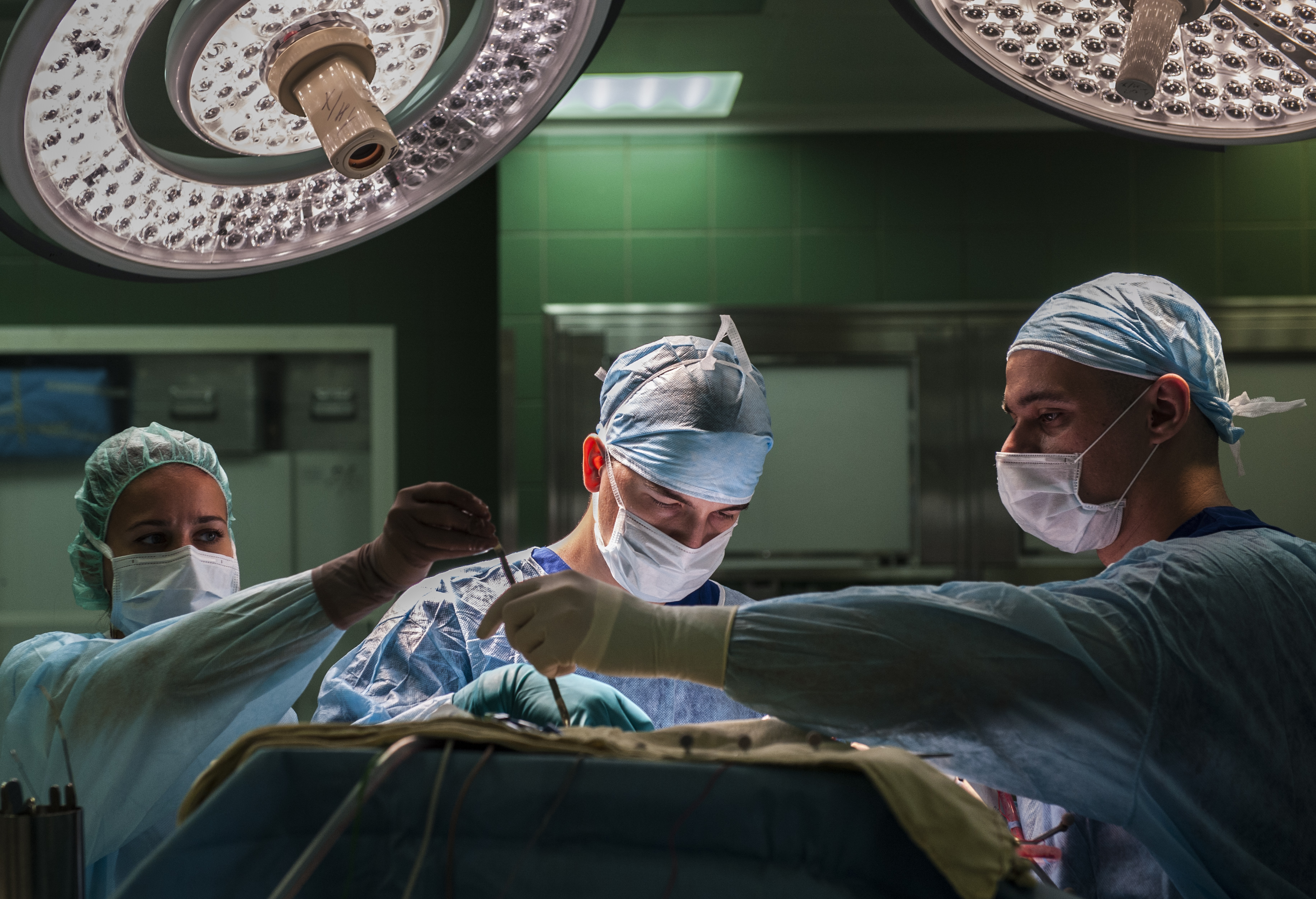
The surgical setting involved during an Adhesiolysis surgery.

==== Adhesiolysis ====
Adhesiolysis involves the surgical removal of adhesions. During this procedure, the surgeon dissects the adhesions while preserving the integrity of underlying abdominal structures. Advanced imaging techniques aid in a more precise and effective removal.

==== Bowel resection ====
In cases where significant bowel damage has occurred, bowel resection may be necessary. This procedure surgically removes the affected bowel segments, with the healthy ends being reconnected through anastomosis. Bowel resection is a major procedure with its own set of risks and complications, and must be carefully considered before proceeding.

==== Abdominal wall reconstruction ====
Abdominal wall reconstruction may be necessary when there is a significant loss of abdominal wall tissue. This reconstruction may involve the use of biologic or synthetic mesh to cover the defect and provide support. This approach not only restores function but also improves the overall stability of the abdominal wall.
