= Resectoscope =

Resectoscope may refer to:

- Cystoscope, with a cauterization loop to avail for resection of tissue
- Hysteroscope, with a cauterization loop to avail for resection of tissue
