= Hermann Fehling =

Hermann Fehling may refer to:

- Hermann von Fehling (1812–1885), German chemist
- Hermann Fehling (physician) (1847–1925), German obstetrician and gynecologist
