= Endometrial ablation =

Medical procedure

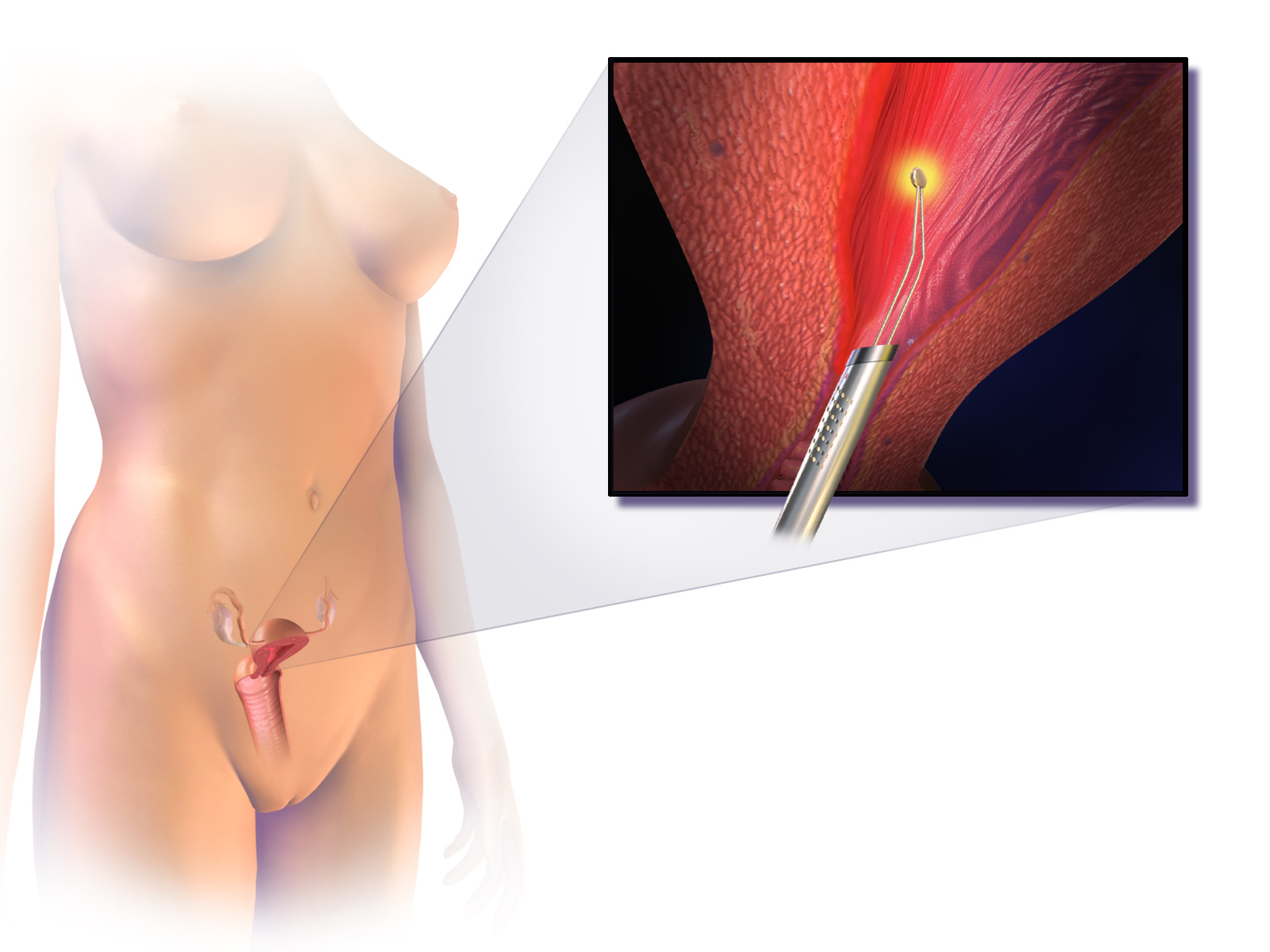
- Schematic illustration of endometrial ablation
- ICD-9-CM: 68.23

Endometrial ablation is a minimally invasive gynecological surgical procedure that ablates or destroys the endometrium, or lining, of the uterus. This destruction causes the formation of scar tissue, preventing the endometrium from regrowing. The decrease in regrowth is intended to reduce the amount of bleeding. Endometrial ablation is typically used to address abnormal uterine bleeding, which can be a symptom of multiple health conditions. Endometrial ablation does not cure any medical conditions, it is used to reduce symptoms that conditions cause. This procedure can cause patients to experience permanent side effects and long-term complications. There are very limited surgical treatments to address abnormal uterine bleeding, the only other option being hysterectomy. It is estimated that around 500,000 patients undergo endometrial ablation procedures each year. This procedure is usually performed by a gynecologist.

Endometrial ablation is typically done in a minimally invasive manner with no external incisions. Slender tools are inserted through the vagina and into the uterus. In some forms of the procedure, one of these tools may be a camera (hysteroscope) to assist with visualization. Other tools include those that harness electricity, high-energy radio waves, heated fluids, or cold temperature to destroy the endometrial lining.

The procedure is almost always performed as an outpatient treatment, either at a hospital, ambulatory surgery center, or physician's office. Patients will most commonly undergo local and/or light sedative anesthesia, or if necessary, general or spinal anesthesia.

Due to the uterine changes that take place after undergoing ablation, patients are unlikely to be able to become pregnant after the procedure, and in pregnancies that do occur, complication risk is high. To reduce the associated mortality risks, it is often recommended for patients to adhere to birth control methods after undergoing endometrial ablation.

== History and origins ==
Early evidence of endometrial ablation exists suggesting the use of chemical astringents to control uterine hemorrhaging occurring during childbirth. Astringents were replaced with techniques like electricity, gamma rays, and steam during the 19th century.

Endometrial ablation as it is thought of most typically today originated in the 1980s with the introduction of the rollerball method. Success rates and patient complications were highly subjective to the skill of the surgeon performing the procedure.

First Generation Techniques: Hysteroscopic methods.

Second Generation Techniques: Thermal balloon and microwave.

Third Generation Techniques: NovaSure, also known as bipolar radiofrequency, cerene cryotherapy. The NovaSure is currently the most used technique for the majority of the endometrial ablations.

== Medical uses ==
Typical medical uses for endometrial ablation include but are not limited to:

- Endometriosis
- Adenomyosis
- Polyendocrine metabolic ovarian syndrome (PMOS)
- Uterine fibroids
- Uterine polyps

As previously mentioned, endometrial ablation does not cure any conditions, rather, it is used to control abnormal uterine bleeding. Abnormal uterine bleeding is frequently a symptom of the aforementioned conditions, thus endometrial ablation may be suggested to patients with these conditions as an attempt to treat this symptom.

== Indications ==
The primary indication for endometrial ablation is abnormal uterine bleeding, including chronic heavy menstrual bleeding, in premenopausal patients. Other primary indications include but are not limited to:

- Heavy menstrual bleeding that interferes with the patient's quality of life
- Abnormal uterine bleeding without uterine abnormalities
- Abnormal uterine bleeding with fibroids with a diameter of less than 3 centimeters

Abnormal menstrual bleeding may appear as heavy menstrual bleeding, irregular menstrual bleeding, abnormal bleeding during sexual activities, or spotting in between periods. Abnormal menstrual bleeding can cause significant physical, social, and emotional toll on the body. In some patients, it limits their ability to participate in work, school, or regular activities normally. If heavy menstrual bleeding reaches the point to where it interferes with the patient's ability to function in day-to-day life, treatment is recommended. Pelvic pain is often a co-morbid symptom to abnormal uterine bleeding, ranging from mild to extreme. 10 to 30% of people assigned female at birth of reproductive age report abnormal uterine bleeding, and 1 in 7 report pelvic pain lasting for at least 6 months. According to Mayo Clinic, the best indicated candidate for an endometrial ablation is at least the age of 40.

Before endometrial ablation is recommended, patients with heavy menstrual bleeding may choose to undergo alternative treatment options prior. Common treatment options include hormonal treatment through form of medication and birth control. The first line of treatment prior to ablation is typically a levonorgestrel-releasing intrauterine system, also known as an IUD (intrauterine device). The IUD must be hormonal, and not copper. This treatment reports a blood loss reduction ranging from 71 to 95%. Other forms of birth control offered include oral contraceptives that contain progestins. This treatment is not as effective as the IUD, with blood reduction rates ranging from 35 to 69%. If birth control is stopped or the IUD is removed, abnormal bleeding is likely to resume.

== Contraindications ==
Endometrial ablation is not suitable for every patient. Medical professionals work closely with patients to determine the best treatment options by taking into account each patient's individual situation, needs, and desires as well as the most up-to-date clinical guidelines to determine if the procedure is suitable for the patient. Contraindications include but are not limited to the following:

- History of cesarean section
- Pregnancy or desire for pregnancy
- Endometrial carcinoma
- Cervical cancer
- Acute pelvic infections
- Retained intrauterine device, such as an IUD
- Uterine anomalies

== Preparation and planning ==
Before undergoing endometrial ablation, patients will go through a pre-procedure evaluation and risk assessment. Components of this often include informed consent, anesthesia evaluation, and a pregnancy test. A preliminary check for pregnancy and cancer is required before undergoing this procedure. All patients will undergo endometrial sampling to test for endometrial carcinoma, as this is an absolute contraindication to endometrial ablation. Any intrauterine devices like IUDs must be removed. An examination of the uterus via ultrasound or hysteroscopy is typical. Some patients may also require further assessment of the uterus through hysteroscopy or saline infusion sonohysterography. Depending on the treatment that is chosen, endometrial ablation is sometimes conducted after treatment with hormones, such as norethisterone or Lupron to reduce the thickness of the endometrium. Patients may discuss options regarding pain management with their medical provider. The procedure can last between 5 and 20 minutes, depending on the technique used.

== Procedure ==
Endometrial ablation may be done in-office or in an operating room. The procedure begins with cervical dilation, which temporarily stretches the cervix to make room for the ablation instruments and/or hysteroscope to enter the uterus. Dilation can be induced medically with pharmacologic agents, or mechanically with a series of metal tools of increasing diameter. After sufficient dilation, the ablation instrument is introduced into the uterine cavity, which is used to partially or fully destroy the endometrial lining. A hysteroscope may be used to assist in visualization of this process and/or ensure that final results are adequate.

The technique utilized to remove or destroy the endometrium varies with endometrial ablation operations. Options consist of:

- Ablation with cryotherapy – The uterus is probed with a chilled probe. The uterine lining is destroyed when the extreme cold at the probe's tip freezes it into pieces. The procedure can be monitored via ultrasound. It takes roughly six minutes to complete one freezing cycle. The size and shape of the uterus will determine how many cycles are required.
- Water-thermal ablation – For roughly 10 minutes, warm fluid is delivered into the uterus. The uterine lining is destroyed by the heat. This technique has the benefit of being usable in patients who have uteri that are shaped differently due to abnormal tissue growth. Lesions inside the uterus or uterine fibroids are two conditions that can lead to the uterus becoming misshapen.
- Ablation with Radiofrequency – A flexible, triangular device inside the uterus is opened using a specialized tool. The uterine lining is destroyed by radiofrequency energy released by the ablation device in 1 to 2 minutes. After that, the device is taken out of the uterus.
- Ablation using Electrocautery – The uterus is visualized using a thin scope. A tool is passed through the scope, such as a wire loop, a probe with a rollerball tip, or a probe with an electrode tip. The uterine lining is removed or destroyed by the device using electric current. General anesthesia is required for electrocautery ablation. This ablation technique is less frequently employed than other techniques.
- Radiofrequency Ablation – The uterus is filled with a device. The uterine lining is destroyed by the device's use of microwave energy.

After the ablation procedure is complete, any concomitant procedures that patients have opted for will also be completed. A common procedure after endometrial ablation is IUD insertion, as effective contraception following endometrial ablation is highly recommended. Other concomitant procedures may include myomectomy and/or tubal ligation.

Endometrial ablation is often an outpatient procedure that does not require an overnight hospital stay. Patients may experience cramping, vaginal discharge, and/or urinary changes during the recovery process.

=== Post-procedure ===
Directions following an endometrial ablation procedure vary based on level of sedation or use of anesthesia. Most patients undergo a dilation of the cervix so that medical instruments can be inserted smoothly into the uterus. To avoid infection risk afterward, patients should avoid inserting anything vaginally like tampons, as well as swimming or soaking in the bath, hot tub, etc. for at least two weeks following the procedure. These activities may risk bacteria entering the vagina, cervix, and uterus. Patients may prefer to use hygiene products for light bleeding for a few weeks post-procedure. If fever or heavy bleeding occurs and does not stop, patients should contact their medical provider. Pain levels vary between patients as they may experience mild to heavy cramping and pelvic pain for up to several days. Pain medication is typically administered. Nausea may persist for some time after undergoing anesthesia and as a side effect of the pain medication. Proper hydration is critical. Patients might attend a follow-up or post-operative appointment for this procedure at the direction and discretion of their medical provider.

=== Cost ===
The cost of an endometrial ablation varies. In the United States, the average patient cost range is between $5,951 and $7,676, depending on technique used and whether or not there were complications during the procedure.

== Technique ==
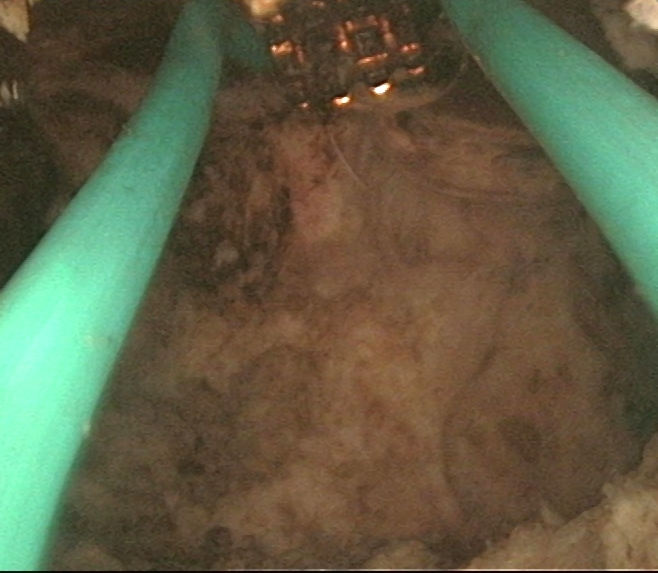
Hysteroscopic image of an endometrial ablation procedure

Several treatment options are available, all of which work by inserting tools into the cervix to destroy the ablate the endometrium. Commonly used ablation systems include:

- The NovaSure – Endometrial Ablation System, FDA approved in 2001, utilizes a metallized mesh electrode array that is introduced into the uterine cavity, applying bipolar electrical energy that creates heat to ablate the endometrium. The Novasure average procedure time is 5 minutes from device insertion to removal and is usually performed under local and/or conscious sedation anesthesia. Most patients leave the treatment center within one hour of treatment. In the Novasure randomized controlled trial for FDA approval, the success rate (i.e., bleeding reduced to a normal or less level) was 78% and the amenorrhea rate (i.e., bleeding eliminated) was 36%. A new version of the device was approved for use in Europe and Canada in 2023.
- The Minerva – Endometrial Ablation System, was FDA approved in July 2015. Minerva works by generating heat from plasma energy that is created and contained inside a leak-proof ablation array that takes the shape of the uterine cavity. The hot membrane surface of the array ablates the endometrium. The Minerva procedure is the fastest FDA-approved treatment, average procedure time is 3.1 minutes from device insertion to removal, and is usually performed under local and/or conscious sedation anesthesia. Most patients leave the treatment center within one hour of treatment. In the Minerva randomized controlled trial for FDA approval, the success rate was 93% and the amenorrhea rate was 72%.
- The Genesys HTA – Hydro-Thermal Ablation System, FDA approved in 2001, uses a hysteroscope device which is inserted into the uterus through the cervical canal, to help doctors safely confirm proper probe placement and to see the area they are treating. In this procedure, the doctor looks at the inside of the uterus with the hysteroscope and then fills the uterus with saline fluid. The fluid is then slowly heated, and the lining of the uterus is burned so that menstrual bleeding periods become less heavy and, in some cases, even stops. The fluid is then cooled and removed by special tubing to protect the external areas of the body from any burns. The average procedure time is 26 minutes. In the HTA randomized controlled trial for FDA approval, the success rate was 68% and amenorrhea rate was 35%.
- The Her Option – Endometrial Ablation System, FDA approved in 2001, is a treatment that creates sub-zero temperatures to freeze and ablate the endometrium. Following the application of local anesthetic around the cervix, a physician uses ultrasound to guide the placement of a cryoprobe to the right uterine horn. The cryoprobe is activated, reducing its temperature to minus 60 °C. The cryoprobe is kept in place while ice is formed in the uterine cavity, under ultrasound observation. Once the appropriate time has passed or the appropriate depth of ice has been achieved, the cryoprobe is warmed to 37 °C. The cryoprobe is then repositioned to the untreated left uterine horn, and the procedure is repeated. Finally, the cryoprobe is warmed and removed. In the Her Option randomized controlled trial for FDA approval, the success rate was 67% and the amenorrhea rate was 22%.
- The Thermachoice III balloon, FDA approved in 1997, was taken off the market in December 2015. This system utilized a heated saline-filled balloon, which was inserted into the uterine cavity to ablate the endometrium. The fluid was safely contained in a flexible and non-allergenic Silastic membrane that conformed to most uterine cavity shapes and sizes.

Older methods utilize hysteroscopy to insert instruments into the uterus to destroy the lining under visualization using a laser, or microwave probe.

== Effectiveness ==
The U.S. Food and Drug Administration approves and audits clinical studies to test and evaluate the effectiveness of all endometrial ablation treatments. Two patient effectiveness outcomes are measured at one year following treatment: 1) success rate = the % of people who have their bleeding reduced to a normal period level or less, and 2) amenorrhea rate = the % of people who have their bleeding eliminated. According to the results of the randomized controlled trials performed for the FDA approval of the different treatment options, effectiveness success rates range from a high of 93% to a low of 67%, and the amenorrhea rates range from a high of 72% to a low of 22%. Compared with hysterectomy, ablation was less effective at reducing pain and excess bleeding; however, it also resulted in fewer adverse events.

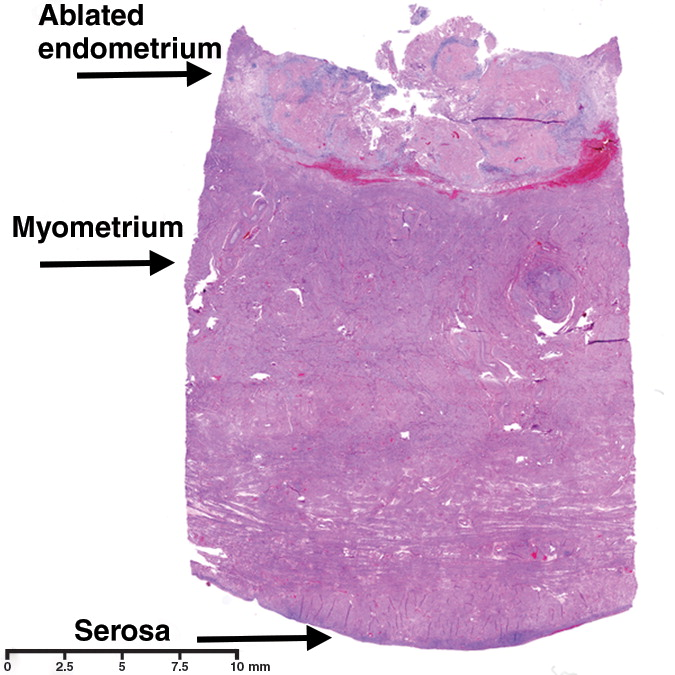

Effectiveness varies largely between patients. Patients report a reduction in menstrual blood loss between 26% and 87%. For some patients, endometrial ablation is not effective in reducing their symptoms and a repeat procedure is required. Around 15.6% of patients who received an endometrial ablation using a second generation technique needed surgical re-intervention. Patients who undergo an endometrial ablation that uses the NovaSure method generally report higher rates of satisfaction. If endometrial ablation is wholly unsuccessful, hysterectomy is indicated. A hysterectomy involves removing the entire uterus, as well as the ovaries and fallopian tubes and is typically reserved as the final treatment option for patients who wish to preserve their fertility. However, it is the most statistically effective treatment option for abnormal uterine bleeding. Likelihood for hysterectomy is increased if patients have had a tubal ligation before their ablation, if they are above the age of 45, and if they experienced severe pelvic pain prior to their procedure. For patients of the same age group who did not undergo a tubal ligation without prior severe pain, the rate of hysterectomy is around 5%. For endometriosis patients receiving an endometrial ablation 40 to 50% of patients experience increased pain or recurrence.

== Complications ==
As with any surgical procedure, there a potential for complications. The potential short-term complications of endometrial ablation include but are not limited to:

- Sepsis (infection)
- Scarring and scar tissue
- Hemorrhage
- Increased pelvic pain
- Perforation of pelvic organs
- Urinary incontinence
- Hematometra
- Loss of fertility or difficulty conceiving
- Damage to the uterus (beyond the endometrial lining)
- Post-ablation tubal sterilization syndrome

Long-term complications of endometrial ablation are also possible. The scarring that occurs post-procedure intended to prevent abnormal uterine bleeding can have significant, adverse, unintended effects on some patients. As the endometrium continues to scar, it can progress and develop into intrauterine scarring, which is scarring within the uterus. If severe enough, the scarring can cause contracture, which occurs when the uterus begins to cave in as scar tissue sticks together. Additionally, there is potential for bleeding to continue to occur beneath the scarring from endometrium that continues to regrow and go unnoticed. This may lead to two different kinds of hematometras, retrograde menstruation, and postablation tubal ligation syndrome. The scarring may also hide evidence of endometrial cancer, delaying a potential diagnosis and necessary treatment. A common reported side effect of these long-term complications is extreme pain.

=== Controversy ===
General misinformation about women's reproductive health has potentially serious implications if patients are given incorrect or limited information about their medical conditions, healthcare options, and the full reality of the procedure by their medical providers. Patients who undergo endometrial ablation without knowing the full extent of its implications may end up in more pain and with more complications than before the procedure. This information gap is also evidenced by the lack of knowledge surrounding identification of potential complications for endometrial ablation, like cornual hematometra and postablation tubal sterilization syndrome. More research and education is recommended for healthcare providers including but not limited to pathologists and radiologists, on identification and treatment of these complications.

=== Alternatives ===
Depending on the need or desire for pursuing an endometrial ablation procedure, there may be suitable alternatives. A common condition that endometrial ablation is used to address is endometriosis. Endometriosis is a condition in which the growths or endometriosis grows outside of the uterus. Growths can affect internal organ function and are commonly found on the bladder, colon, and ovaries; some growths have been located as far in the body as the lungs. Endometriosis is not confirmed to be fully hormonal in nature, and can affect people of all sexes. Endometriosis can impact patients as young as their late teens. Young patients who do choose to undergo an endometrial ablation for endometriosis and who wish to conceive are contraindicated.

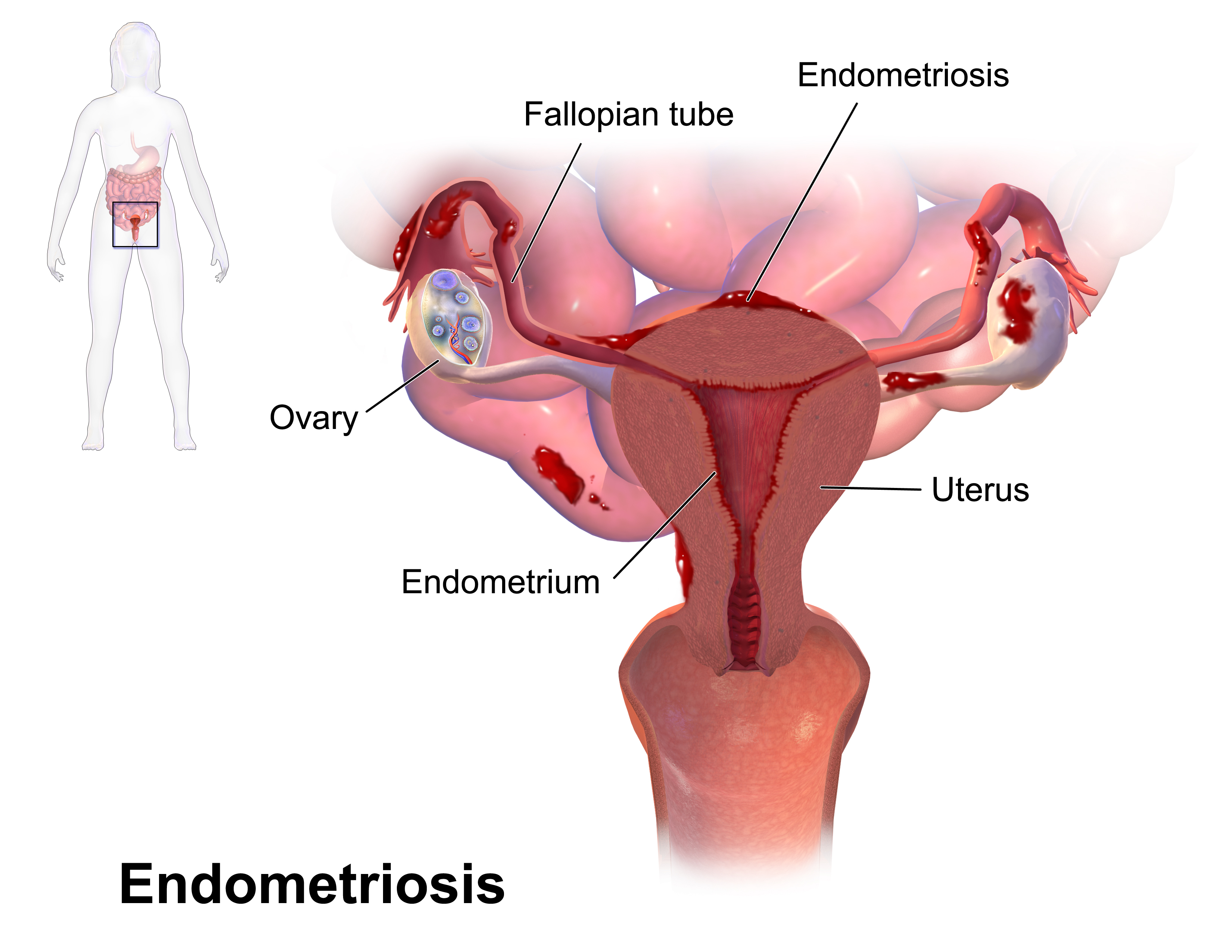
An internal diagram of endometriosis.

Endometrial ablation is frequently indicated for endometriosis patients by medical professionals as an attempt to remove endometriosis growths or lesions through ablating or burning them away. The recurrence rates in growths are significant, as the ablation procedure does not always end up fully removing them. It is difficult to fully remove these growths using ablation. Ongoing research suggests excision to be a more effective and less risky procedure and alternative to endometrial ablation for endometriosis. Excision allows for deeper investigation and removal into the tissue and decreased risk of thermal damage as compared to ablation. Excision is also less likely to cause inflammation, leaving more optimal conditions for tissue regrowth, decreased likelihood of adhesion development, and less pain.

== See also ==
- Hysteroscopy
- Heavy menstrual bleeding
- Hysterectomy
- Endometrium
- Asherman's syndrome
