= Joseph Asherman =

Renowned Medical Doctor

- יוסף אשרמן
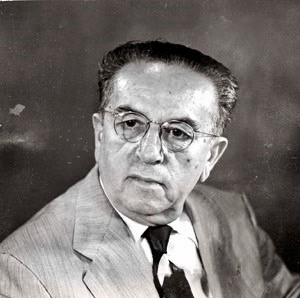
- Born: September 11, 1889; Rosovice, Bohemia, Austria-Hungary
- Died: October 9, 1968 (aged 79); Herzliya, Israel
- Education: Charles University, Prague
- Occupation: Gynecologist-Obstetrician
- Years active: 1913–1968
- Spouse: Malka Vilner (m. 1921)
- Children: 1

Joseph (Gustav) Asherman (Hebrew: יוסף אשרמן; September 11, 1889 — October 9, 1968) was an Israeli gynecologist, director of the Kirya Maternity Hospital. The Asherman's syndrome is named after him.

== Biography ==
Asherman was born in 1889 in Rosovice in Austria-Hungary (today in the Czech Republic). Studied medicine at Charles University in Prague and in 1913 received a doctorate in medicine. During the World War I he served as a medical officer in the Austro-Hungarian army (1914–18) and was a member of the Bar Kochba organization in Prague.

In 1920 he immigrated to Israel (then British Palestine). In Israel, he first served as a physician in the Jezreel Valley, Yavneel and the Galilee. He specialized in gynecology, managed the obstetrics and gynecology department at Hadassah Hospital on Balfour Street in Tel Aviv, initially established and managed the Well Baby system and later established and managed the maternity hospital Ha'Kirya. His committed and constant activity in the field of obstetrics, made him head of the obstetrics and gynecology services in the city of Tel Aviv.

Asherman dealt with many issues and was a member of many associations; among others, he was president of the Bar Kochba Prague alumni in Israel, president of the Israel Gynecologists' Association, member of the American Society for the Study of Infertility, member of the French and Brazilian gynecological societies, member of the International College of Surgeons, vice president of international fertility societies and delegate to scientific congresses in New York, Amsterdam and Naples. He was also appointed visiting professor at the Hebrew University of Jerusalem.

Asherman has published dozens of medical articles. Among other things, he described a syndrome that bears his name, Asherman's Syndrome, which includes scarring and infection in the uterus due to curettage, which was first described by a German doctor (Heinrich Fritsch) in 1894 but was characterized following two articles by Asherman in 1948 and 1950. Winner of the Szold Prize for Medicine and Public Hygiene, 1960 (Honorary Award).

Among his students: Prof. Nadav Soferman, Dr. Chaim Abarbanel and Dr. Yehuda Aryeh Abramovitz, who managed Hadassah Hospital (Tel Aviv) for many years.

In 1965, his wife, Malka, died unexpectedly. Asherman lived in Tel Aviv, and in the last year of his life in Herzliya, where he died in 1968, at the age of 79. He was buried next to his wife Malka, in the Nahalat Yitzhak cemetery. A street in Tel Aviv is named after him.

== Published works ==
- Maternal Health: Tips for the Pregnant Woman, Tel Aviv: Hadassah Medical Association (The Hadassah Medical Association Library named after Natan and Lina Strauss), [Therap-]. (Booklet, published in several editions; edition B: 1932
- Joseph G. Asherman, Towards Motherhood, Tel Aviv: Tel Aviv-Yafo Municipality - Department of Public Medical Services, 1957.
- Dr. J. Asherman, Prof. Dr. L.P. Meir, Dr. B. Farber and Dr. Y. Rivkai (eds.), Mother and Baby: Medical-Educational Guide for Parents, Tel Aviv: Massada, 1945.

== See also ==
- Health in Israel
