= Rosovice =

- Municipality
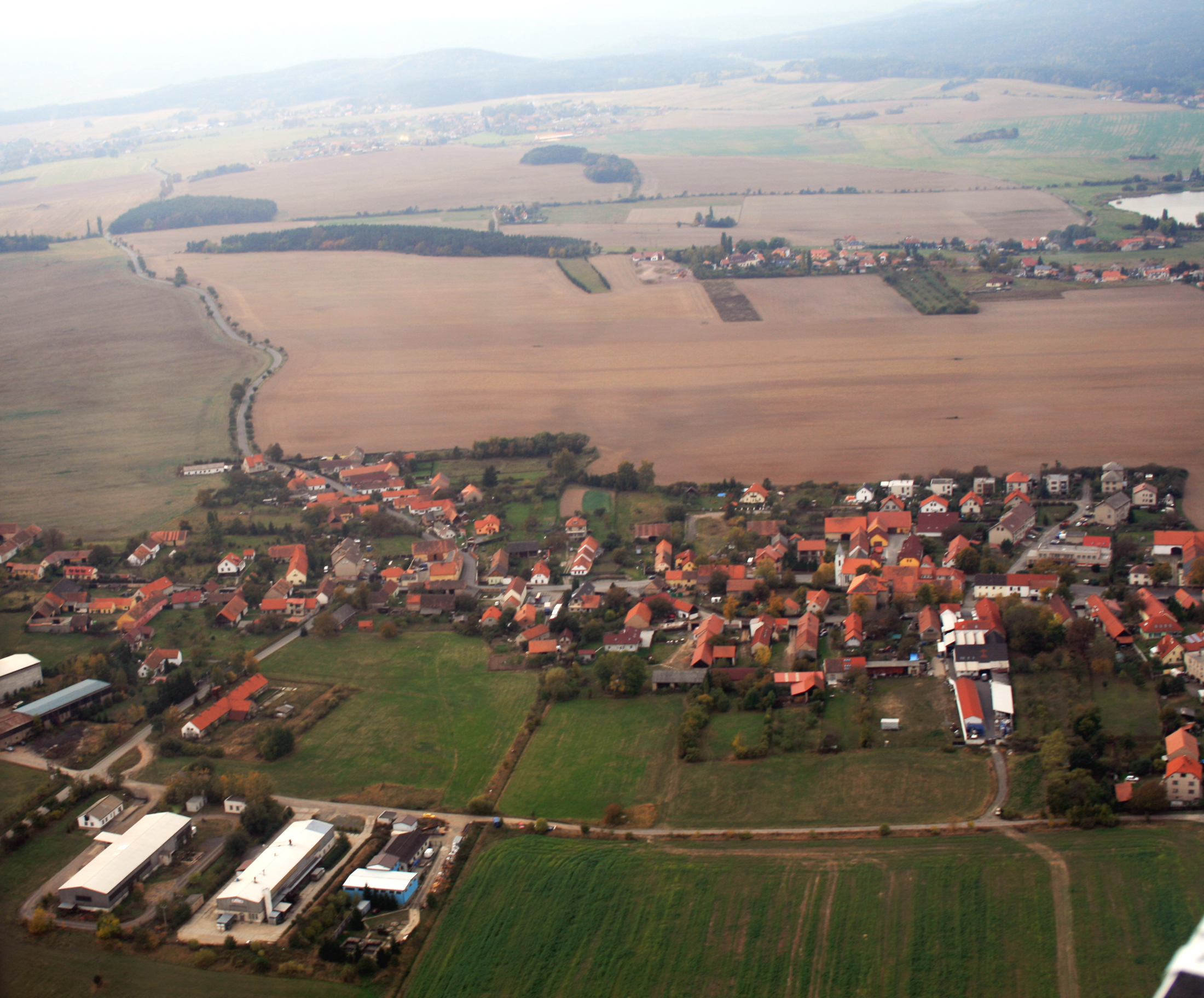
- Aerial view

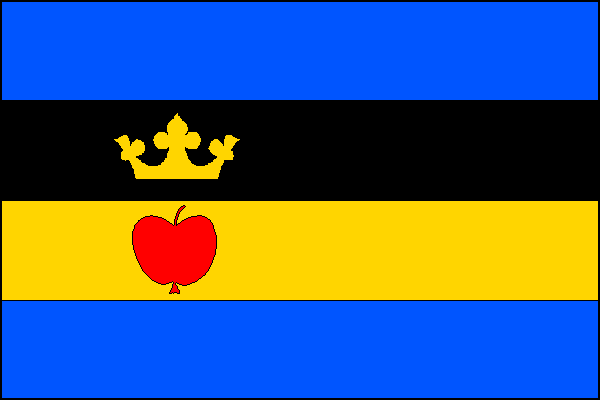
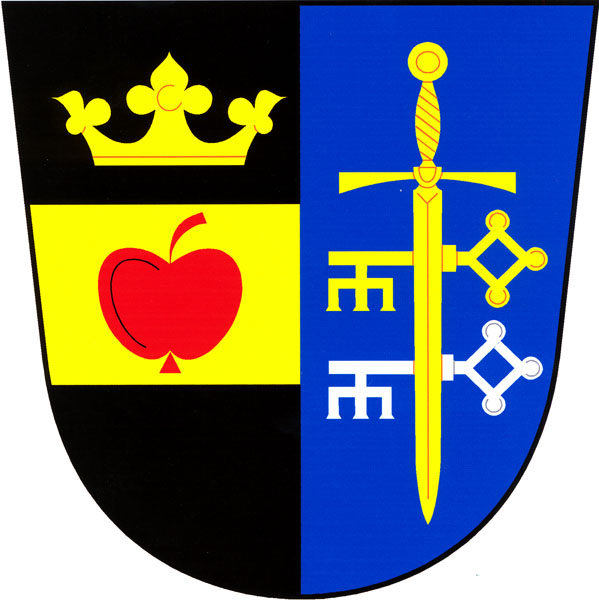
- Flag Coat of arms

- Location in the Czech Republic
- Coordinates: 49°45′24″N 14°6′32″E
- Country: Czech Republic
- Region: Central Bohemian
- District: Příbram
- First mentioned: 1305

Area
  - Total: 25.31 km^{2} (9.77 sq mi)
- Elevation: 428 m (1,404 ft)

Population (2026-01-01)
  - Total: 898
  - Density: 35.5/km^{2} (91.9/sq mi)
- Time zone: UTC+1 (CET)
  - Summer (DST): UTC+2 (CEST)
- Postal code: 262 11
- Website: www.rosovice-obec.cz

Rosovice is a municipality and village in Příbram District in the Central Bohemian Region of the Czech Republic. It has about 900 inhabitants.

== Administrative division ==
Rosovice consists of two municipal parts (in brackets population according to the 2021 census):

- Rosovice (748)
- Sychrov (77)

== Etymology ==
The initial name of Rosovice was Rosejovice. The name was derived from the personal name Rosej, meaning "the village of Rosej's people". The name Rosovice has been used from the 17th century.

== Geography ==
Rosovice is located about 10 kilometres (6 mi) northeast of Příbram and 35 km (22 mi) southwest of Prague. It lies mostly in the Brdy Highlands, only a small part of the municipal territory in the southeast extends into the Benešov Uplands. The highest point is at 574 m (1,883 ft) above sea level. The village of Sychrov is situated on the shore of the fishpond Sychrovský rybník, supplied by the stream Sychrovský potok.

== History ==
The first written mention of Rosovice is from 1305. From around 1600, the area was part of the Dobříš estate and shared its owners.

== Demographics ==
Historical population

Year	Pop.	±%
1869	1,024	—
1880	1,078	+5.3%
1890	1,129	+4.7%
1900	1,119	−0.9%
1910	1,102	−1.5%

Year	Pop.	±%
1921	1,035	−6.1%
1930	1,044	+0.9%
1950	827	−20.8%
1961	814	−1.6%
1970	782	−3.9%

Year	Pop.	±%
1980	718	−8.2%
1991	708	−1.4%
2001	735	+3.8%
2011	807	+9.8%
2021	825	+2.2%

Source: Censuses

== Transport ==
There are no railways or major roads passing through the municipality.

== Sights ==
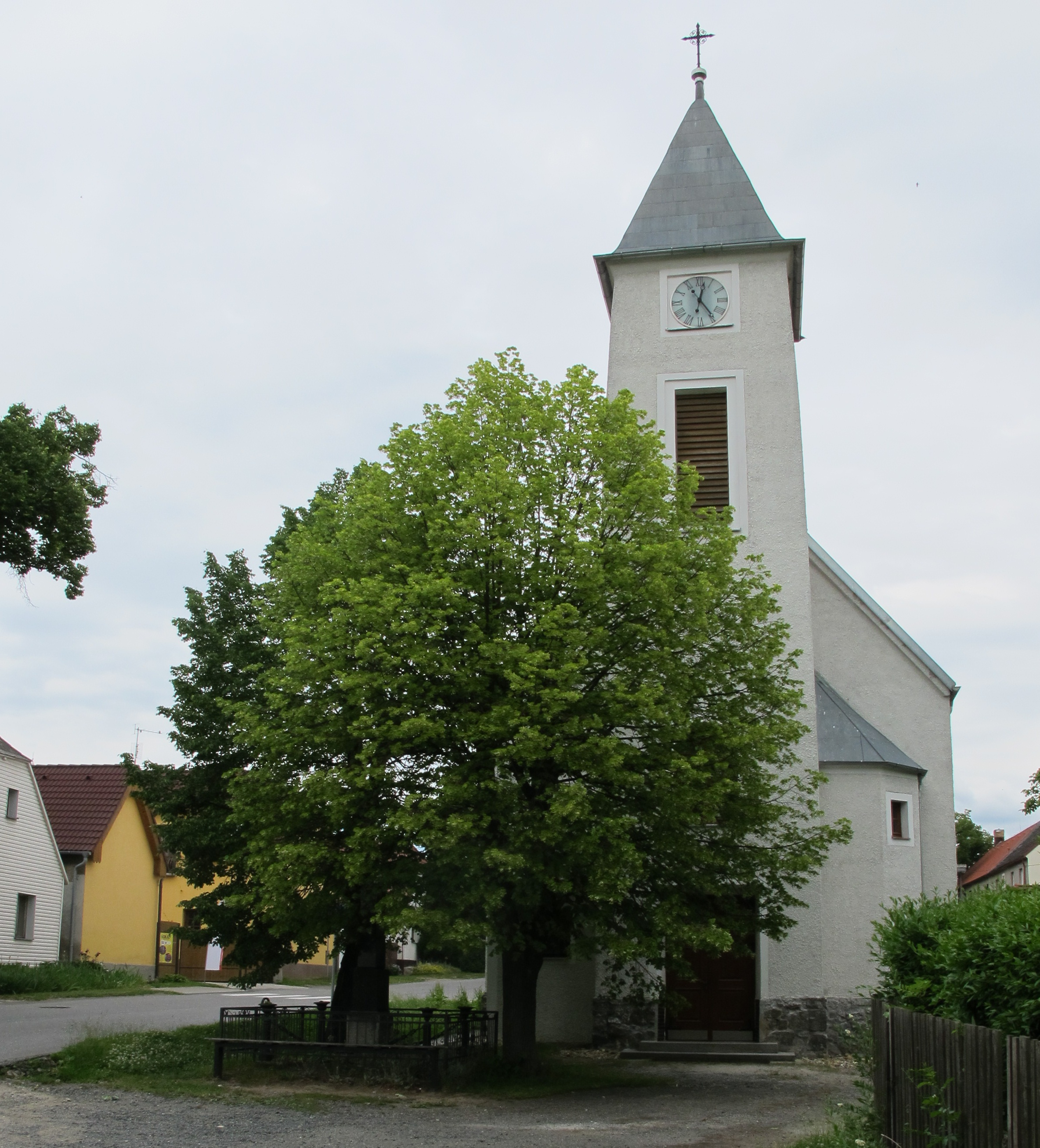
Church of Saints Peter and Paul

The main landmark of Rosovice is the Church of Saints Peter and Paul. It is a modern church, which dates from 1913.

== Notable people ==
- Joseph Asherman (1889–1968), Israeli gynecologist
