= Gynography =

Medical imaging of the female genital organs

Gynography (Spanish: ginógrafo) is defined as "radiography of the female genital organs" that uses "air or other gas" that is injected intraperitoneally as a contrast medium. The gynograph was invented by Abner I. Weisman, a medical doctor. The gynograph is a new improved gynoroentgenologic apparatus used by gynecologists and radiologists in performing hysterosalpingography. The advantage of the gynograph over uterosalpingography – which involves the installation of foreign material into the uterus – is that it is "practically free from complications" such as intravasation of the venous sinuses of the uterus, pulmonary emboli, foreign body retention cysts, pelvic peritonitis, rupture of the fallopian tube, and death. The only known rare side effect is the occasional flaring-up of an old chronic salpingitis.

Gynographic survey is the term for the method of surveying the female genital tract that involves gaseous insufflations, instillation of small amounts of an opaque substance, and the instillation of a foreign radiopaque material.

== Other usage ==
In feminist literature, the term gynographic criticism is used by gynographic critics (gynographic critiques) as a form of "sexualized language" or gendered way of writing by syntax. In statistics, the term gynography is used as a title for the statistical presentations of topics about women, such as marriage and family including mean (average) age, etc.

== See also ==
- Gynecologic ultrasonography
