= Falloposcopy =

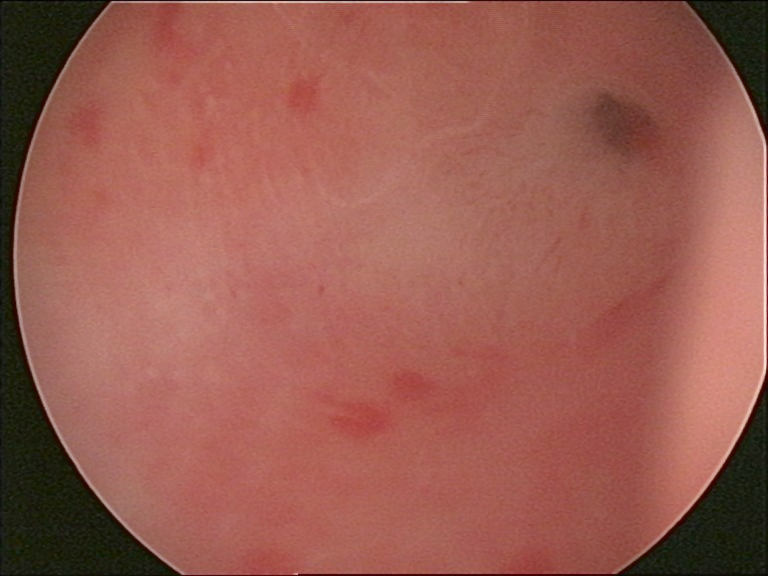
- A falloposcope would enter the proximal tubal ostium identified here via hysteroscopy
- ICD-9-CM: 66.19
- OPS-301 code: 1-673

Falloposcopy (occasionally also falloscopy) is the inspection of the fallopian tubes through a micro- endoscope. The falloposcope is inserted into the tube through its opening in the uterus at the proximal tubal opening via the uterotubal junction; technically it could also be inserted at the time of abdominal surgery or laparoscopy via the distal fimbriated end.

A distinction is sometimes made between falloposcopy and salpingoscopy (with salpingoscopy being laparoscopic.) In some contexts the terms are equated.

== Indications ==
Falloposcopy has been primarily used in diagnosis and management of tubal infertility, however, it is generally not considered part of the routine work-up for infertility. Most tubal problems in women with infertility are treated by IVF. There is no established role for falloposcopy for evaluation of other tubal pathology.

== Instrumentation ==
The first modern falloposcope that was described was the coaxial system by Kerin in 1970. Later the linerar-everting catheter (LEC) system was introduced. A coaxial falloposcope is an microendoscope of 0.5 mm diameter that is flexible and contains optical and illuminating fibers; it has a magnifying capacity. The coaxial system needs a hysteroscope for its uterine passage. In contrast, the LEC system consists of an external unfurling ballon catheter with an internal endoscope that is used transcervically without the need for a hysteroscope.

== Procedure ==
The patient needs general anesthesia or conscious sedation for the duration of the procedure and is in a lithotomy position. For the coaxial system initially a hysteroscope is introduced into the uterus to identify the proximal tubal ostium. Once the ostium is identified the falloposcope can be inserted through the operative channel of the hysteroscope and advanced. With the LEC system the balloon catheter is advanced into the uterine horn, and then, under endoscopic vision the endoscope is advanced into the tube as the balloon catheter unfurls. Findings can be projected on a video system.

== Findings and interventions ==
The typical method of tubal evaluation, hysterosalpingography, has shortcomings in terms of false negative and false positive results. It has been argued that falloposcopy allows for a more accurate evaluation of the tubal canal. Obstructions, adhesions within the tubal canal, and debris can be identified. The procedure allows removal of debris or filmy adhesions from within the fallopian tube, further in selected cases proximal tubal obstruction can be overcome and the tube can be recanalized allowing for pregnancy. Proximal tubal occlusion has also been overcome by using hysteroscopy with tubal canalization using a catheter, not a falloposcope. Extensive tubal obstruction, however, cannot be overcome by falloposcopy and would require tubal surgery or in vitro fertilization (IVF) to be overcome to achieve a pregnancy.

== Complications ==
Perforation of a fallopian tube appears the only reported complication and is encountered in about 4-5% of inspected tubes.

== Limitations ==
In 2001, Rimbach et al. reported in a large multicenter study involving 367 patients on the limitations of the procedure. Problems were encountered in the ability to enter the tubes, and, even when tubes were cannulated, light reflexions or "white out" from healthy tissue as well as adhesions turned out to be a major problem. Thus, the investigators were able to fully examine tubes in only 2 out of 3 cases; perforations occurred in about 4% of cases. Since then, interest in falloposcopy has declined and few studies have been published.

The procedure is not usually used in the United Kingdom.
