= Asherman's syndrome =

Scar formation in the uterus

Asherman syndrome
- Other names: Intrauterine adhesions (IUA) or Intrauterine synechiae
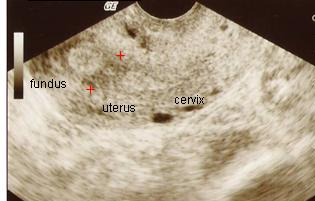
- Ultrasound view.
- Specialty: Gynaecology
- Frequency: 0.03%
- Named after: Joseph Asherman; Heinrich Fritsch

Asherman's syndrome (AS) is an acquired condition that occurs when scar tissue (adhesions) forms inside the uterus and/or the cervix. It is characterized by variable scarring inside the uterine cavity, where in many cases the front and back walls of the uterus stick to one another. AS can be the cause of menstrual disturbances, infertility, and placental abnormalities. Although the first case of intrauterine adhesion was published in 1894 by Heinrich Fritsch, it was only after 54 years that a full description of Asherman syndrome was carried out by Joseph Asherman. Several other terms have been used to describe the condition and related conditions including: uterine/cervical atresia, traumatic uterine atrophy, sclerotic endometrium, and endometrial sclerosis.

There is no single cause of AS. Risk factors include myomectomy, cesarean section, infections, age, genital tuberculosis, and obesity. Genetic predisposition to AS is being investigated. Some studies show that a severe pelvic infection, independent of surgery may cause AS. AS can develop even if the woman has not had any uterine surgeries, trauma, or pregnancies. While rare in North America and European countries, genital tuberculosis is a cause of AS in other countries such as India.

== History ==
The condition was first described in 1894 by Heinrich Fritsch (Fritsch, 1894) and further characterized by gynecologist Joseph Asherman (1889–1968) in 1948.

It is also known as Fritsch syndrome, or Fritsch-Asherman syndrome.

== Signs and symptoms ==
It is often characterized by a decrease in flow and duration of bleeding (absence of menstrual bleeding, little menstrual bleeding, or infrequent menstrual bleeding) and infertility. Menstrual anomalies are often but not always correlated with severity: adhesions restricted to only the cervix or lower uterus may block menstruation. Pain during menstruation and ovulation is sometimes experienced and can be attributed to blockages.

== Causes ==
The cavity of the uterus is lined by the endometrium. This lining is composed of two layers, the functional layer (adjacent to the uterine cavity) which is shed during menstruation and an underlying basal layer (adjacent to the myometrium), which is necessary for regenerating the functional layer. Trauma to the basal layer, typically after a dilation and curettage (D&C) performed after a miscarriage, delivery, or after an abortion to remove retained products of conception can lead to the development of intrauterine scars resulting in adhesions that can obliterate the cavity to varying degrees. In a series of women in 1896 88% of AS cases were reported to occur after a D&C was performed. In the extreme, the whole cavity can be scarred and occluded. Even with relatively few scars, the endometrium may fail to respond to estrogen.

Asherman's syndrome affects women of all races and ages equally, suggesting no underlying genetic predisposition for its development. AS can result from other pelvic surgeries including cesarean sections, removal of fibroid tumours (myomectomy) and from other causes such as IUDs, pelvic irradiation, schistosomiasis and genital tuberculosis. Chronic endometritis from genital tuberculosis is a significant cause of severe intrauterine adhesions (IUA) in the developing world, often resulting in total obliteration of the uterine cavity which is difficult to treat.

An artificial form of AS can be surgically induced by endometrial ablation in women with excessive uterine bleeding, in lieu of hysterectomy.

== Diagnosis ==
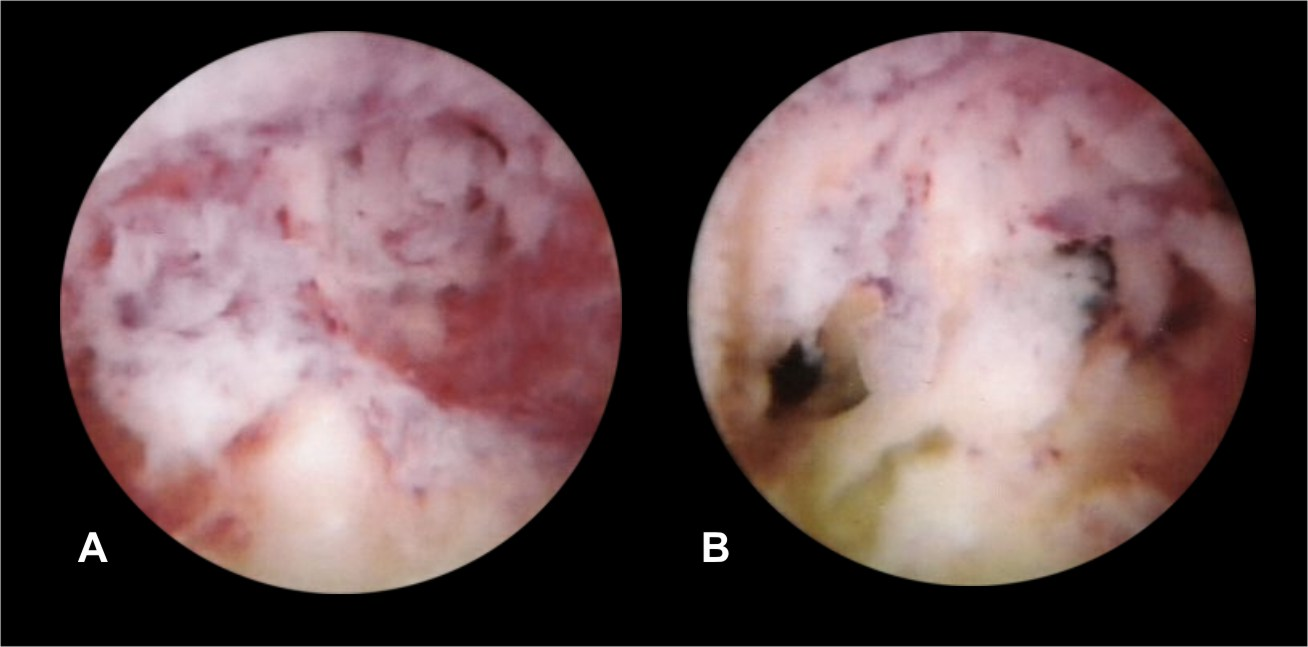
Hysteroscopic view of intrauterine adhesions

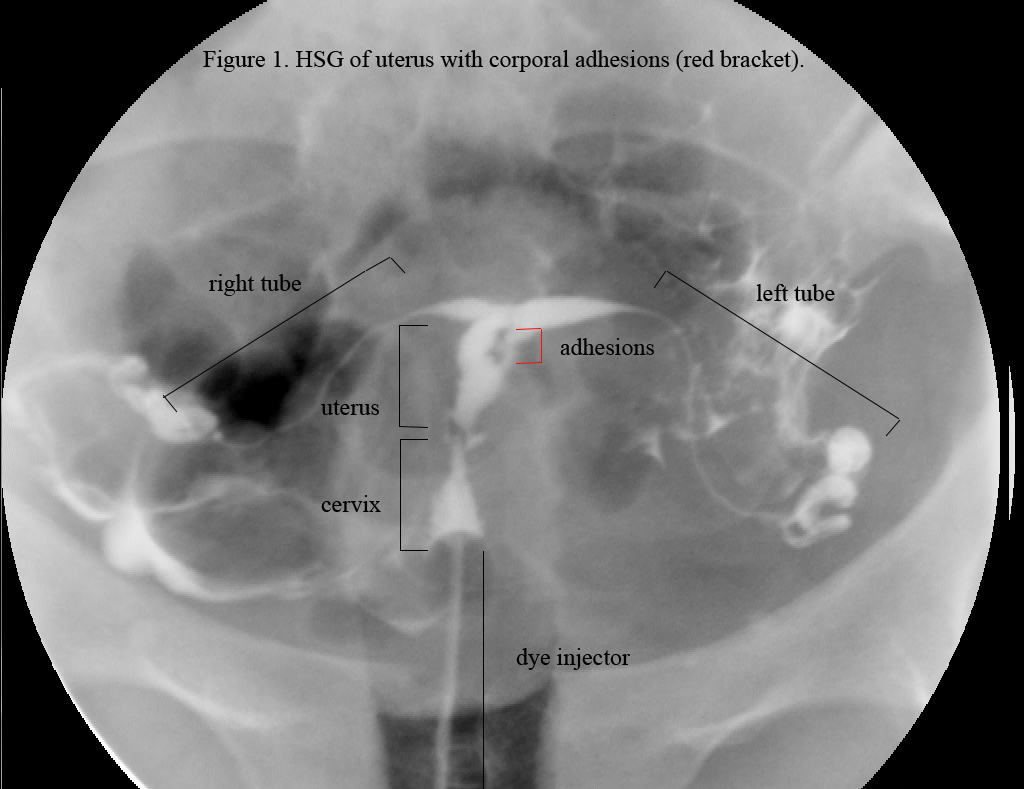
HSG showing filling defects at the adhesion sites. Additionally, this uterus appears to be T-shaped.

The history of a pregnancy event followed by a D&C leading to secondary amenorrhea or hypomenorrhea is typical. Hysteroscopy is the gold standard for diagnosis. Imaging by sonohysterography or hysterosalpingography will reveal the extent of the scar formation. Ultrasound is not a reliable method of diagnosing Asherman's Syndrome. Hormone studies show normal levels consistent with reproductive function.

=== Classification ===
Various classification systems were developed to describe Asherman's syndrome (citations to be added), some taking into account the amount of functioning residual endometrium, menstrual pattern, obstetric history, and other factors which are thought to play a role in determining the prognosis. With the advent of techniques that allow visualization of the uterus, classification systems were developed to take into account the location and severity of adhesions inside the uterus. This is useful as mild cases with adhesions restricted to the cervix may present with amenorrhea and infertility, showing that symptoms alone do not necessarily reflect severity. Other patients may have no adhesions but amenorrhea and infertility due to a sclerotic atrophic endometrium. The latter form has the worst prognosis.

== Prevention ==
A 2013 review concluded that no studies were reporting on the link between intrauterine adhesions and long-term reproductive outcome after miscarriage, while similar pregnancy outcomes were reported after surgical management (e.g. D&C), medical management or conservative management (that is, watchful waiting). There is an association between surgical intervention in the uterus and the development of intrauterine adhesions, and between intrauterine adhesions and pregnancy outcomes, but there is still no clear evidence of any method of prevention of adverse pregnancy outcomes.

In theory, the recently pregnant uterus is particularly soft under the influence of hormones and hence, easily injured. D&C (including dilation and curettage, dilation and evacuation/suction curettage, and manual vacuum aspiration) is a blind, invasive procedure, making it difficult to avoid endometrial trauma. Medical alternatives to D&C for evacuation of retained placenta/products of conception exist, including misoprostol and mifepristone. Studies show this less invasive and cheaper method to be an efficacious, safe and an acceptable alternative to surgical management for most women. It was suggested as early as 1993 that the incidence of IUA might be lower following medical evacuation (e.g., Misoprostol) of the uterus, thus avoiding any intrauterine instrumentation. So far, one study supports this proposal, showing that women who were treated for missed miscarriage with misoprostol did not develop IUA, while 7.7% of those undergoing D&C did. The advantage of misoprostol is that it can be used for evacuation not only following miscarriage, but also following birth for retained placenta or hemorrhaging.

Alternatively, D&C could be performed under ultrasound guidance rather than as a blind procedure. This would enable the surgeon to end scraping the lining when all retained tissue has been removed, avoiding injury.

Early monitoring during pregnancy to identify miscarriage can prevent the development of, or, as the case may be, the recurrence of AS, as the longer the period after fetal death following D&C, the more likely adhesions may be to occur. Therefore, immediate evacuation following fetal death may prevent IUA.The use of hysteroscopic surgery instead of D&C to remove retained products of conception or placenta is another alternative that could theoretically improve future pregnancy outcomes, although it could be less effective if tissue is abundant. Also, hysteroscopy is not a widely or routinely used technique and requires expertise.

There is no data to indicate that suction D&C is less likely than sharp curettage to result in Asherman's. A recent article describes three cases of women who developed intrauterine adhesions following manual vacuum aspiration.

Intrauterine adhesions also form after hysteroscopic surgery such as myomectomy, polypectomy or septum removal. Mechanical barriers such as Womed Leaf or hyaluronic acid gels can be used to prevent formation of IUA after such adhesiogenic procedures or after D&C.

== Treatment ==
Fertility may sometimes be restored by the removal of adhesions, depending on the severity of the initial trauma and other individual patient factors. Operative hysteroscopy is used for visual inspection of the uterine cavity during adhesion dissection (adhesiolysis). However, hysteroscopy is yet to become a routine gynaecological procedure and only 15% of US gynecologists perform office hysteroscopy. Adhesion dissection can be technically difficult and must be performed with care to not create new scars and further exacerbate the condition. In more severe cases, adjunctive measures such as laparoscopy are used in conjunction with hysteroscopy as a protective measure against uterine perforation. Microscissors are usually used to cut adhesions. Electrocauterization is not recommended.

As IUA frequently reforms after surgery, techniques have been developed to prevent the recurrence of adhesions. Methods to prevent adhesion reformation include the use of mechanical barriers (Foley catheter, saline-filled balloon uterine stents), gel barriers (Seprafilm, Spraygel, autocrosslinked hyaluronic acid gel Hyalobarrier) and mechanical barrier film (Womed Leaf) to maintain opposing walls apart during healing, thereby preventing the reformation of adhesions. A common pharmacological method for preventing reformation of adhesions is sequential hormonal therapy with estrogen followed by a progestin to stimulate endometrial growth and prevent opposing walls from fusing. However, there have been no randomized controlled trials (RCTs) comparing post-surgical adhesion reformation with and without hormonal treatment, and the ideal dosing regimen or length of estrogen therapy is not known. A recent meta-analysis compared different post-surgical prevention barrier strategies and concluded that there was no single superior treatment. Furthermore, diagnostic severity and outcomes are assessed according to different criteria (e.g., menstrual pattern, adhesion reformation rate, conception rate, live birth rate). More comparable studies are needed in which reproductive outcomes can be analysed systematically. However, the latest randomized controlled trial, published in July 2024, demonstrated a clinically significant improvement in a group of patients with Asherman syndrome who received the Womed Leaf mechanical barrier film compared to a control group where no adhesion prevention tool was used.

Follow-up tests (HSG, hysteroscopy or SHG) are necessary to ensure that adhesions have not reformed. Further surgery may be necessary to restore a normal uterine cavity. According to a recent study among 61 patients, the overall rate of adhesion recurrence was 27.9%. In moderate and severe cases, it is up to 76%.

== Prognosis ==
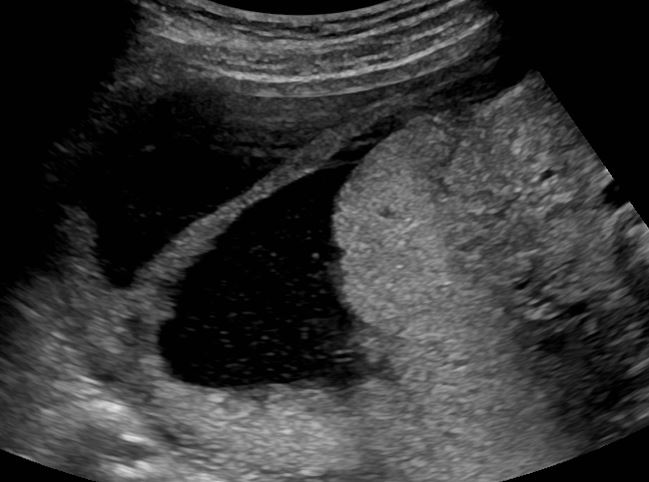
Amniotic sheet on ultrasound

The extent of adhesion formation is critical. Mild to moderate adhesions can usually be treated successfully. Extensive obliteration of the uterine cavity or fallopian tube openings (ostia) and deep endometrial or myometrial trauma may require several surgical interventions and/or hormone therapy or even be uncorrectable. If the uterine cavity is adhesion-free but the ostia remain obliterated, IVF remains an option. If the uterus has been irreparably damaged, surrogacy or adoption may be the only options.

Depending on the degree of severity, AS may result in infertility, repeated miscarriages, pain from trapped blood, and future obstetric complications If left untreated, the obstruction of menstrual flow resulting from adhesions can lead to endometriosis in some cases.

Patients who carry a pregnancy even after treatment of IUA may have an increased risk of having abnormal placentation including placenta accreta where the placenta invades the uterus more deeply, leading to complications in placental separation after delivery. Premature delivery, second-trimester pregnancy loss, and uterine rupture are other reported complications. They may also develop incompetent cervix where the cervix can no longer support the growing weight of the fetus, the pressure causes the placenta to rupture, and the mother goes into premature labour. Cerclage is a surgical stitch that helps support the cervix if needed.

Pregnancy and live birth rates have been reported to be related to the initial severity of the adhesions, with 93, 78, and 57% pregnancies achieved after treatment of mild, moderate, and severe adhesions, respectively, and resulting in 81, 66, and 32% live birth rates, respectively. The overall pregnancy rate after adhesiolysis was 60%, and the live birth rate was 38.9% according to one study.

Age is another factor contributing to fertility outcomes after treatment of AS. For women under 35 years of age treated for severe adhesions, pregnancy rates were 66.6% compared to 23.5% in women older than 35.

== Epidemiology ==
AS has a reported incidence of 25% of D&Cs performed 1–4 weeks post-partum, up to 30.9% of D&Cs performed for missed miscarriages and 6.4% of D&Cs performed for incomplete miscarriages. In another study, 40% of patients who underwent repeated D&C for retained products of conception after missed miscarriage or retained placenta developed AS.

In the case of missed miscarriages, the time period between fetal demise and curettage may increase the likelihood of adhesion formation due to fibroblastic activity of the remaining tissue.

The risk of AS also increases with the number of procedures: one study estimated the risk to be 16% after one D&C and 32% after three or more D&Cs. However, a single curettage often underlies the condition.

In an attempts to estimate the prevalence of AS in the general population, it was found in 1.5% of women undergoing hysterosalpingography HSG, and between 5 and 39% of women with recurrent miscarriage.

After miscarriage, a review estimated the prevalence of AS to be approximately 20% (95% confidence interval: 13% to 28%).
