= Hyalobarrier =

Hyalobarrier is a substance to keep tissue apart post surgery and therefore prevent adhesions. It contains autocross-linked hyaluronan. Highly viscous due to condensation. Hyaluronan is present in cartilage and skin hence there is a natural metabolic pathway for it. This gel is used to separate organs and tissue after surgery.

Scientific documentation so far covers the gynaecology speciality. IE Laparoscopic surgery, hysteroscopy/hysteroscopic surgery but also open surgery.

According to data in a Cochrane collaboration review barrier agents may be a little more effective in preventing adhesions than no intervention. The Cochrane report also states that the incidence of postsurgical adhesions is as high as 50 to 100%. In a recent review by C Sutton (University of Surrey, Guilford UK), it is stated that Hyalobarrier is the only anti adhesive substance that has published data for intrauterine use.

== Additional information ==
- Laparoscopy
- Asherman's syndrome
