= Gynoroentgenology =

Radiologic imaging in gynecology

Gynoroentgenology is the abbreviation of gynecological roentgenology. It is the radiologic imaging of the gynecologic parts of the female human body in order to make a radiologic diagnosis of a gynecologic disease. The term gynecologic radiology is related to gynoroentgenology. Gynoroentgenologic imaging can detect and diagnose primary neoplasms, metastasis, therapy-related lesions, congenital lesions, inflammation, miscellaneous diseases, pseudolesions, normal variants, infection uterine arteriovenous malformations and cystic adenomyosis. An example procedure is gynography.

== See also ==
- Gynecologic ultrasonography
- Gynography
