= Uterotubal junction =

Connecting junction in female reproductive system

The uterotubal junction is the connection between the endometrial cavity of the uterus and the fallopian tube (uterine tube) at the proximal tubal opening, the beginning of the intramural part of the fallopian tube. Histologically, the endometrial epithelium changes over to ciliated tubal epithelium.

== Function ==
Patency of the uterotubal junction is necessary for normal reproduction. The tubes can get blocked here by infection (salpingitis) and surgical intervention may be necessary.

Mouse studies have indicated that selective passage of individual spermatozoa may occur at this junction, with abnormal morphology being identified as a significant selection criterion, leading to predominantly normal sperm passing towards the ovum. Absence of the protein calmegin has also been suggested as a critical factor for reliable sperm passage.

== Other ==
The uterotubal junction is accessible by hysteroscopy and the entry point for tubal cannulation and falloposcopy. Contraceptive methods have been developed to block the uterotubal junction.
