= Gynecologic ultrasonography =

Application of medical ultrasonography to the female pelvic organs

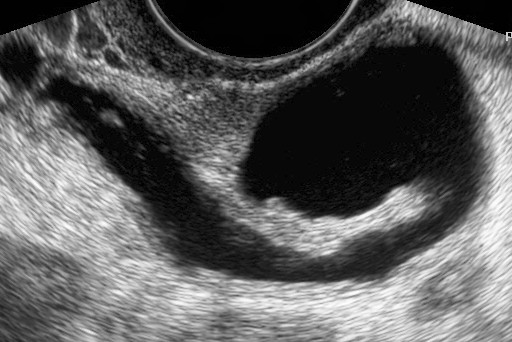
- Left hydrosalpinx on gynecologic ultrasonography
- Other names: Gynecologic sonography
- ICD-9-CM: 88.76, 88.79
- OPS-301 code: 3-05d

Gynecologic ultrasonography or gynecologic sonography refers to the application of medical ultrasonography to the female pelvic organs (specifically the uterus, the ovaries, and the fallopian tubes) as well as the bladder, the adnexa, and the recto-uterine pouch. The procedure may lead to other medically relevant findings in the pelvis.This technique is useful to detect myomas or mullerian malformations.

== Routes ==
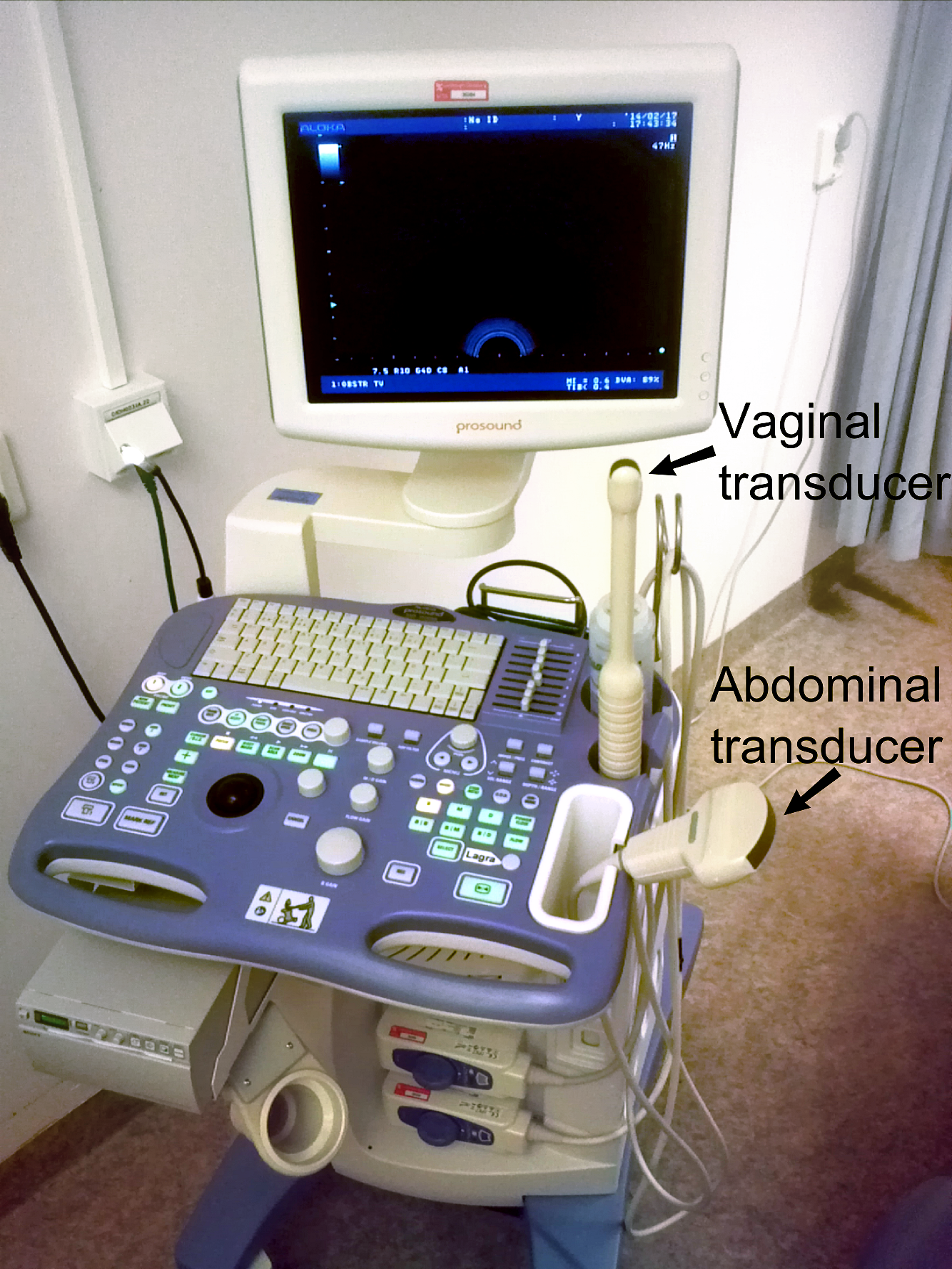
Device for both vaginal ultrasonography and abdominal ultrasonography

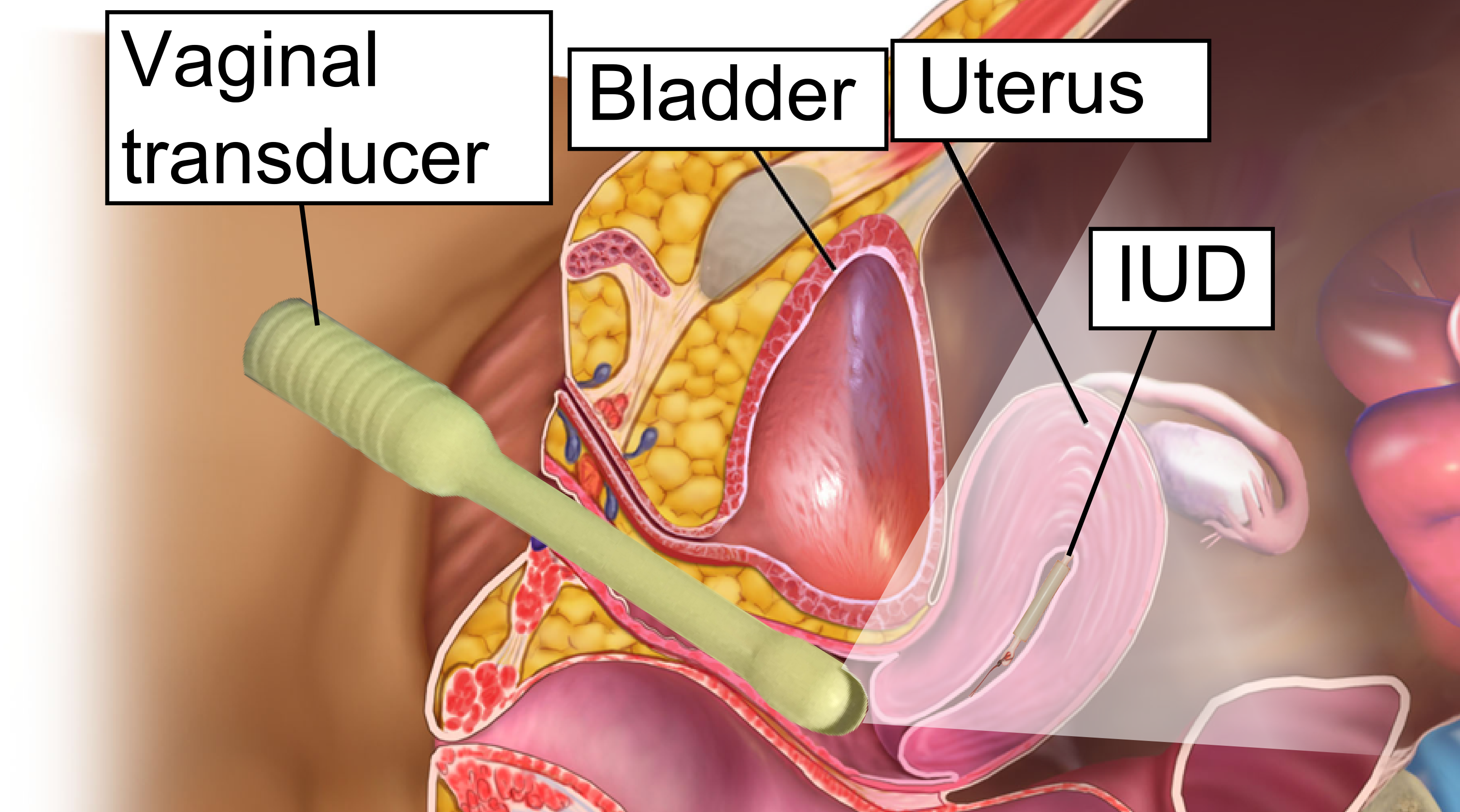
Transvaginal ultrasonography to check the location of an intrauterine device (IUD)

The examination can be performed by transabdominal ultrasonography, generally with a full bladder which acts as an acoustic window to achieve better visualization of pelvis organs, or by transvaginal ultrasonography with a specifically designed vaginal transducer. Transvaginal imaging utilizes a higher frequency imaging, which gives better resolution of the ovaries, uterus and endometrium (the fallopian tubes are generally not seen unless distended), but is limited to depth of image penetration, whereas larger lesions reaching into the abdomen are better seen transabdominally. Having a full bladder for the transabdominal portion of the exam is helpful because sound travels through fluid with less attenuation to better visualize the uterus and ovaries which lies posteriorly to the bladder. The procedure is by definition invasive when performed transvaginally. Scans are performed by health care professionals called sonographers, or gynecologists trained in ultrasound.

== Applications ==
Gynecologic sonography is used extensively:

- to assess pelvic organs,
- to diagnose acute appendicitis
- to diagnose and manage gynecologic problems including endometriosis, leiomyoma, adenomyosis, ovarian cysts and lesions,
- to identify adnexal masses, including ectopic pregnancy,
- to diagnose gynecologic cancer
- in infertility treatments to track the response of ovarian follicles to fertility medication (i.e. Pergonal). However, it often underestimates the true ovarian volume.

Through transvaginal sonography ovarian cysts can be aspirated. This technique is also used in transvaginal oocyte retrieval to obtain human eggs (oocytes) through sonographic directed transvaginal puncture of ovarian follicles in IVF.

Gynecologic ultrasonography is sometimes overused when it is used to screen for ovarian cancer in women who are not at risk for this cancer. There is consensus that women with only average risk for ovarian cancer should not be screened with this procedure for cancer.

== Sonohysterography ==
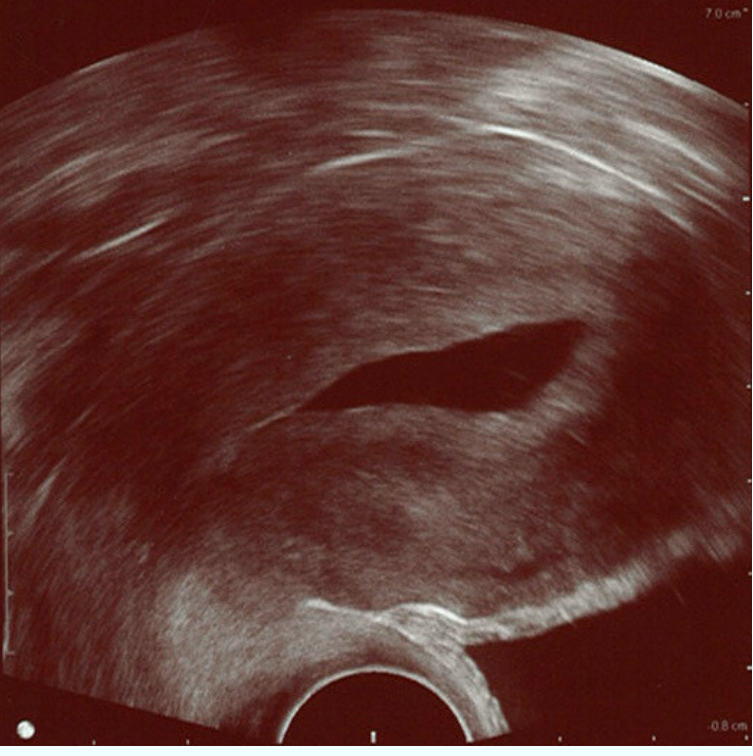
Sonohysterography. The sterile saline instilled into the cavity of the uterus is anechoic (rendered as dark in the middle of the image). It shows a normal endometrium as a hyperechoid (brighter) band around the cavity, in this case without any focal changes.

Sonohysterography is a specialized procedure by which fluid, usually sterile saline (then called saline infusion sonography or SIS), is instilled into the uterine cavity, and gynecologic sonography performed at the same time. A review in 2015 came to the conclusion that SIS is highly sensitive in the detection of intrauterine abnormalities in subfertile women, comparable to hysteroscopy. SIS is highly sensitive and specific test in the diagnosis of uterine polyps, submucous uterine fibroids, uterine anomalies and intrauterine adhesions (as part of Asherman's syndrome), and can be used as a screening tool for subfertile women prior to IVF treatment.

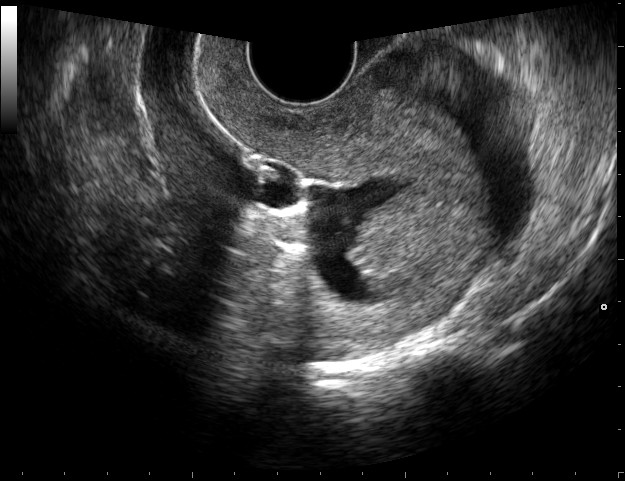
Sonohysterography using a balloon catheter (seen in the middle of the image)

== See also ==
- Gynography
- Gynoroentgenology
- Obstetric ultrasonography
- Sonosalpingography
- Vaginal ultrasonography
- Sonohysterosalpingography
- Hystero contrast sonography
