= Hermann Fehling (physician) =

German obstetrician and gynecologist

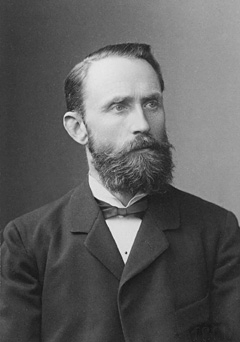
Hermann Johannes Karl Fehling

Hermann Johannes Karl Fehling (14 July 1847 - 11 November 1925) was a German obstetrician and gynecologist who was a native of Stuttgart. He was the son of the chemist Hermann von Fehling (1811-1885).

In 1872 he received his medical doctorate from the University of Leipzig, and following graduation remained in Leipzig as an assistant to obstetrician Carl Siegmund Franz Credé (1819-1892). In 1877 he became director of the Württemberg state midwifery school in Stuttgart, and later accepted a teaching job at the University of Tübingen (1883).

In 1887 he became a professor of obstetrics at the University of Basel, and afterwards served as a professor at the Universities of Halle (1894) and Strasbourg (1900). In the aftermath of World War I, Fehling along with other German professors were expelled from the University of Strasbourg. He eventually settled in Baden-Baden, where he died in 1925.

Hermann Fehling is considered to be one of the leading gynecologists of his era, and made contributions in his research of disorders that included eclampsia, rachitic pelvis and puerperal osteomalacia. In 1877, with Heinrich Fritsch (1844-1915), he founded the journal Zentralblatt für Gynäkologie.

== Selected publications ==
- Die Physiologie und Pathologie des Wochenbetts, fur Studirende und Arzte, (Physiology and pathology of post-natal conditions, for students and physicians), 1890.
- Lehrbuch der Frauenkrankheiten, (Textbook of women's diseases), 1900.
- Entwicklung der Geburtshilfe und Gynakologie im 19. Jahrhundert, (Development of obstetrics and gynecology in the 19th Century), 1925.
