= Heinrich Fritsch =

German gynecologist and obstetrician

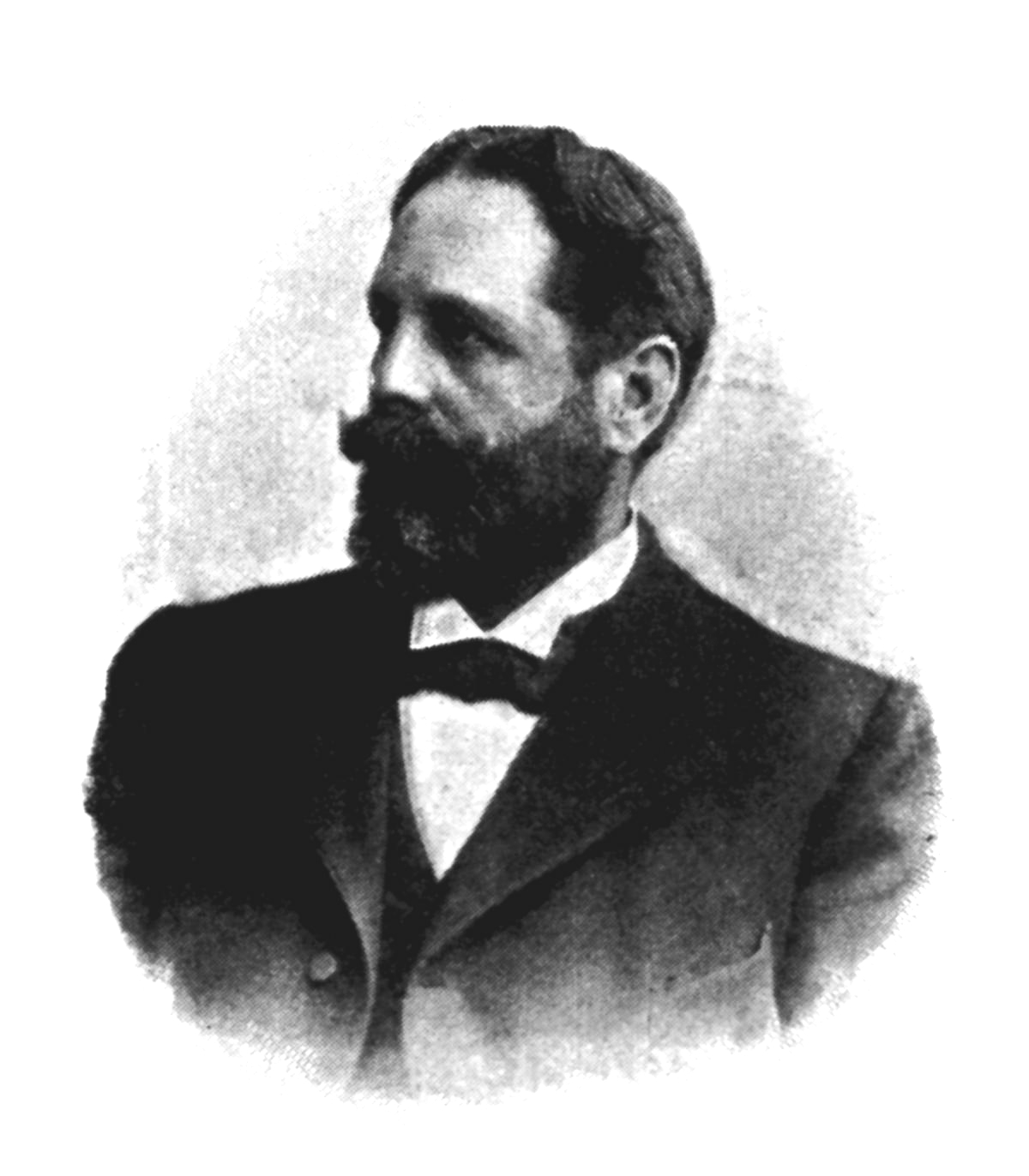
Heinrich Fritsch.

Heinrich Fritsch (5 December 1844 – 12 May 1915) was a German gynecologist and obstetrician who was a native of Halle an der Saale.

He studied medicine at the Universities of Tübingen, Würzburg and Halle. He became a member of Suevia Tübingen (1865) and the Corps Guestphalia Halle (1866). At the University of Halle he earned his medical doctorate in 1869. Afterwards he remained at Halle as an assistant at the clinic of obstetrics under Robert Michaelis von Olshausen (1835-1915). In 1877 he became an associate professor, and in 1882 was a professor and director of the obstetrical clinic at Breslau. From 1893 to 1910 he was a professor at the University of Bonn.

Fritsch was a highly regarded surgeon and teacher, who is credited for training an entire generation of acclaimed gynecologists, that included physicians such as Hermann Johannes Pfannenstiel (1862-1909). In 1894 he provided an early description of "Asherman's syndrome", and his name is associated with "Fritsch's manipulation", an obstetric compression technique used for controlling bleeding.

In 1877, with Hermann Fehling (1847-1925), he founded the gynecological journal Zentralblatt für Gynäkologie.

== Selected publications ==
- Die Lageveränderungen der Gebärmutter, (Position Changes of the Uterus) 1880; In Billroth-Pitha's Handbuch der Allgemeinen und Speciellen Chirurgie.
- Die Krankheiten der Frauen, (Diseases of women), 1881; 12th edition, 1910; translated into English, French, Italian, and Russian; The diseases of women, a manual for physicians and students (1883).
- Grundzüge der Pathologie und Therapie des Wochenbetts, (Pathological features and treatment of post-natal conditions), 1884; translated into French and Russian.
- Gerichtsärztliche Geburtshilfe, (Forensic medical obstetrics), 1901.
