= Air polymer-type A =

Medication

Clinical data
- Trade names: ExEm Foam
- License data: US DailyMed: ExEm
- Pregnancy category: Contraindicated
- ATC code: none

Legal status
- Legal status: US: ℞-only

Identifiers
- UNII: PDC6A3C0OX; M825OX60H9

Air polymer-type A, sold under the brand name ExEm Foam, is a drug for the detection of fallopian tube patency (openness) in people with known or suspected infertility. It was approved for use in the United States in November 2019.

Air polymer-type A is infused into the uterus to allow for visual assessment of fallopian tubes during an ultrasound examination called a sonohysterosalpingography.

The most common adverse reactions are pelvic pain and abdominal pain, nausea and faintness (caused by a nerve and blood vessel reaction called vasovagal reaction) and post-procedure spotting.

== History ==
The US Food and Drug Administration (FDA) approved air polymer-type A based on literature reports. To evaluate how well air polymer-type A works, the FDA primarily used data from two trials. Trial A was conducted at a site in Italy and Trial B at three sites in Poland.

Evaluation of side effects was based on multiple literature reports and collected safety reports from countries where air polymer-type A is already approved.

== Ingredients ==
- polymer type A (hydroxyethyl cellulose)
- glycerin
- purified water

== See also ==
- Fertility testing
- Fallopian tube obstruction
- Chromopertubation
- Gynecologic ultrasonography
- Hystero contrast sonography
