= Fertility testing =

Process for assessing human fertility

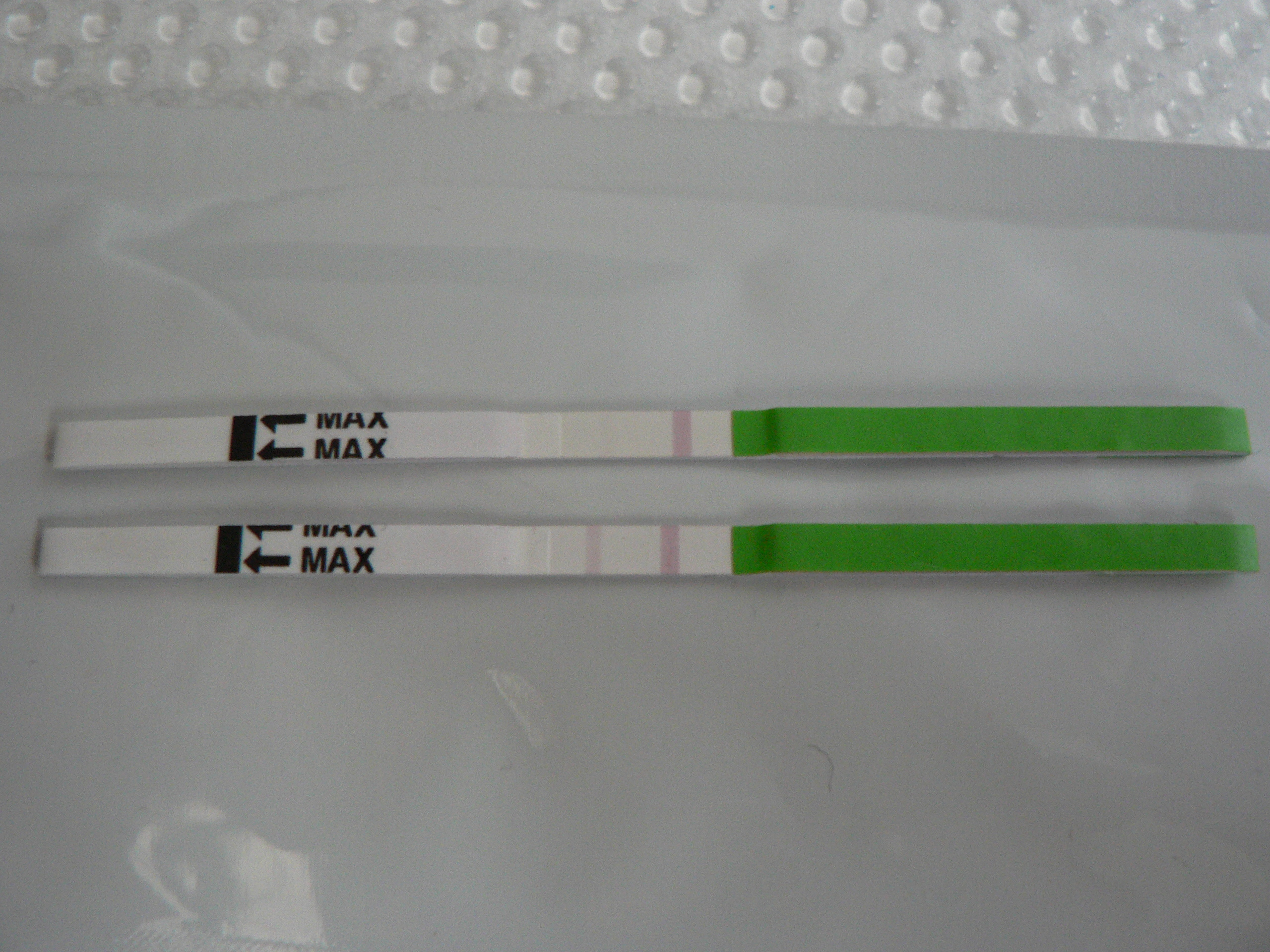
- ovulation prediction kit
- Purpose: assess fertility

Fertility testing is the process by which fertility is assessed, both generally and also to find the "fertile window" in the menstrual cycle. General health affects fertility, and STI testing is an important related field.

== Women ==
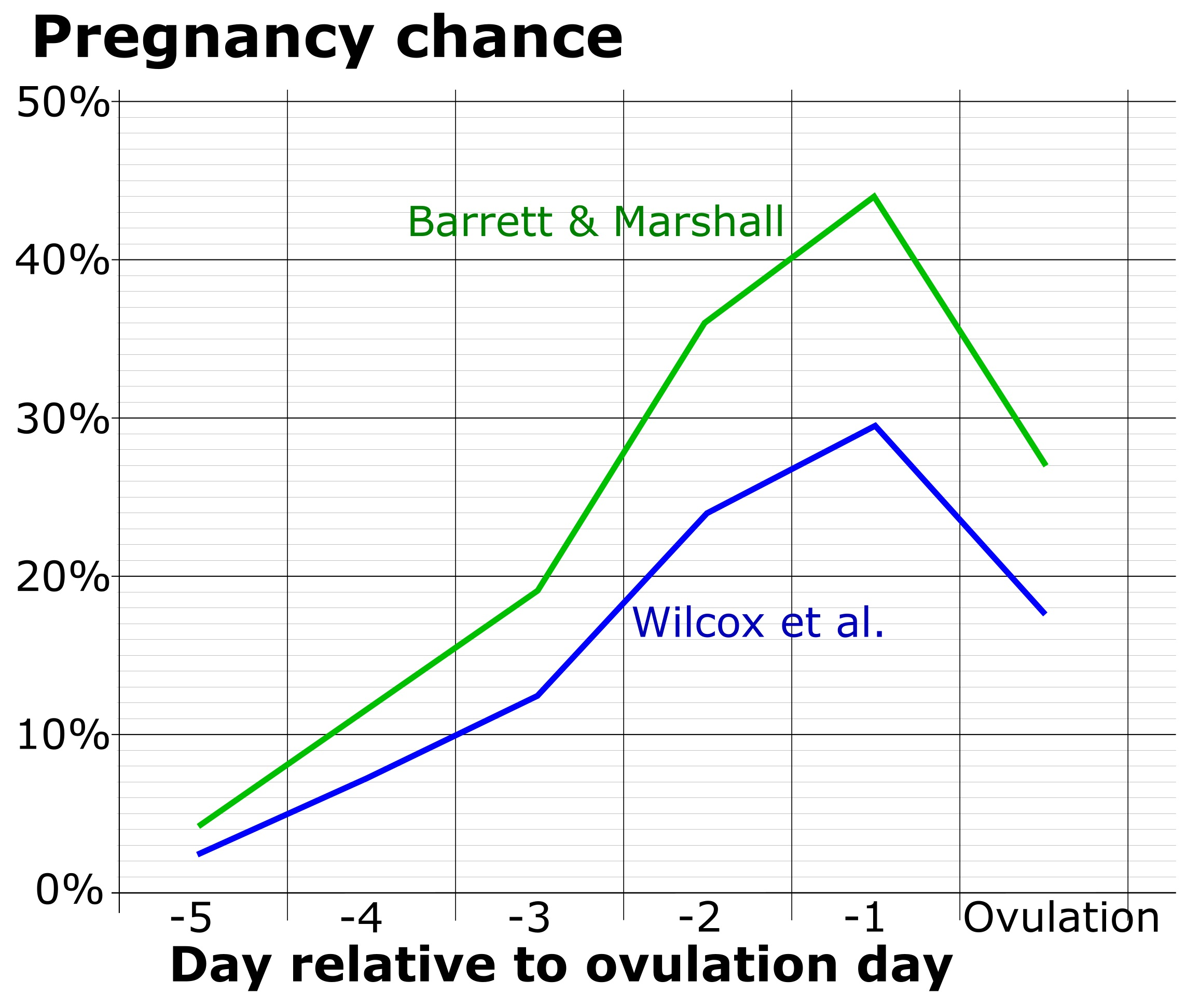
Chance of fertilization by day relative to ovulation.

Healthy women are fertile from puberty until menopause, although fertility is typically much reduced towards the extremes of this period. The onset of puberty is typically identified by menarche and the presence of secondary sexual characteristics such as breast development, the appearance of pubic hair and changes to body fat distribution. The end of fertility typically comes somewhat before menopause, as fertility declines to a point where establishing a viable pregnancy is very unlikely.

=== Ovulation testing ===
Various methods of predicting the timing of ovulation exist, some of which may be performed at home or in a clinical setting. Knowing the timing of ovulation can help a woman to determine the days of the menstrual cycle that are most likely to result in conception.

==== Stretch test ====
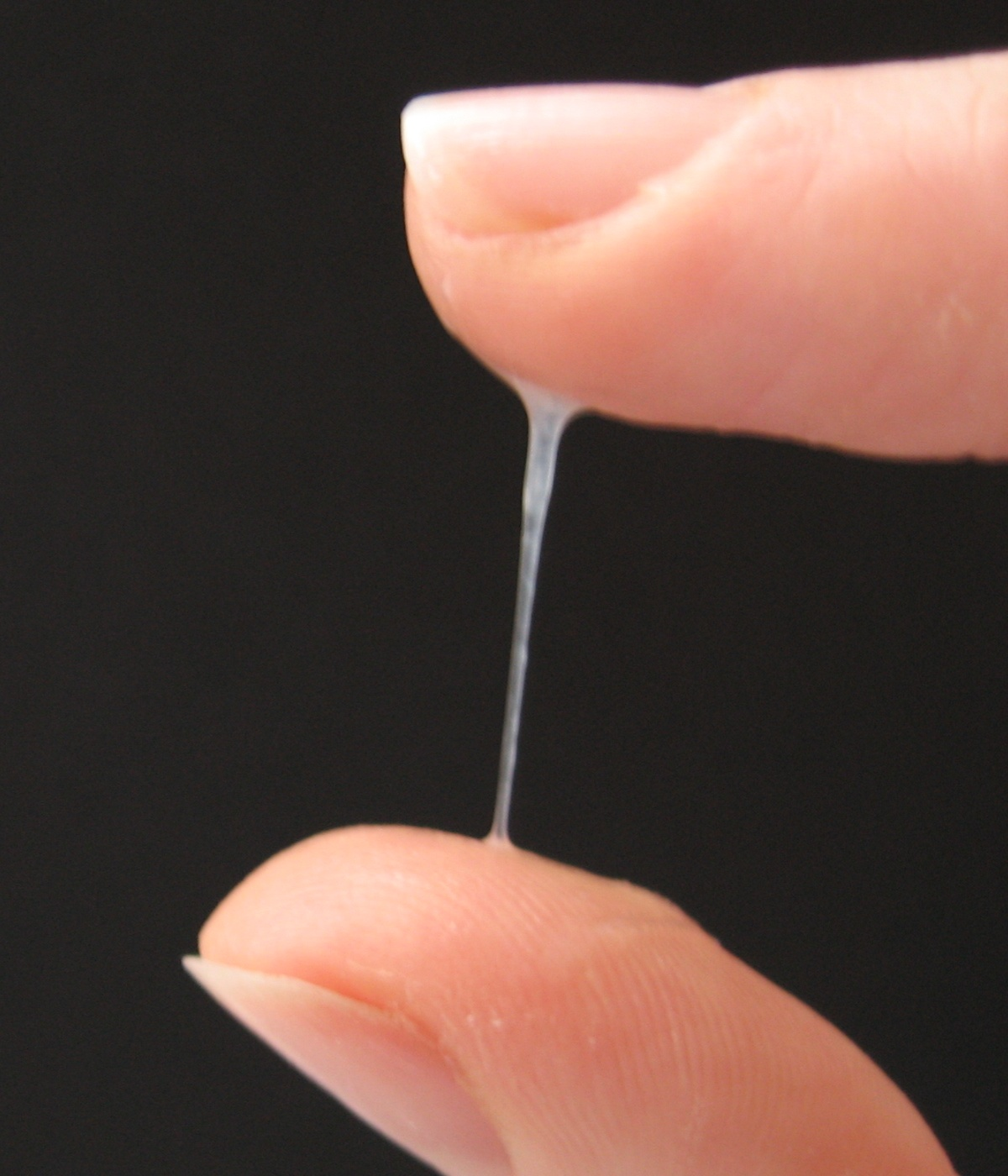
Cervical mucus

The cervix is a structure between the vaginal canal and the uterus. The cervical cells secrete mucus that changes its consistency over different parts of the menstrual cycle. During the fertile window, the mucus increases in quantity and becomes clear and stretchy and is known as "egg-white cervical mucus." This mucus allows sperm to survive in and travel through it. In contrast, when outside of the fertile window, the mucus does not stretch, is sticky, and is not clear.

The stretch test can be performed prior to and immediately after urination. Mucus can be sampled with by either wiping with toilet paper or inserting a clean finger into the vagina. The mucus quality can then be observed by stretching the mucus between the finger and thumb as shown in the image.

==== Ovulation prediction kit ====
Urinary ovulation prediction kits are typically found over-the-counter and there are many brands to choose from. This test measures the amount of luteinizing hormone, a hormone that increases just before ovulation, that is in the urine. Before ovulation, the luteinizing hormone levels dramatically increase; this is known as the "LH surge". This test can recognize the LH surge about 1–1.5 days prior to ovulation. Additionally, some ovulation prediction kits detect estrone-3-glucuronide. This is a breakdown product of estrogen and will have increased levels in the urine around the time of ovulation. This test is able to detect luteinizing hormone and estrone-3-glucuronide 90% of the time.

This test can be used in multiple ways. A few drops of urine can be added to the test device tip. Alternatively, the test device tip can be held in the urine stream. Finally, the test device tip can be dipped into a cup of urine. The test will indicate positive or negative results in about five minutes.

==== Electronic fertility monitors ====
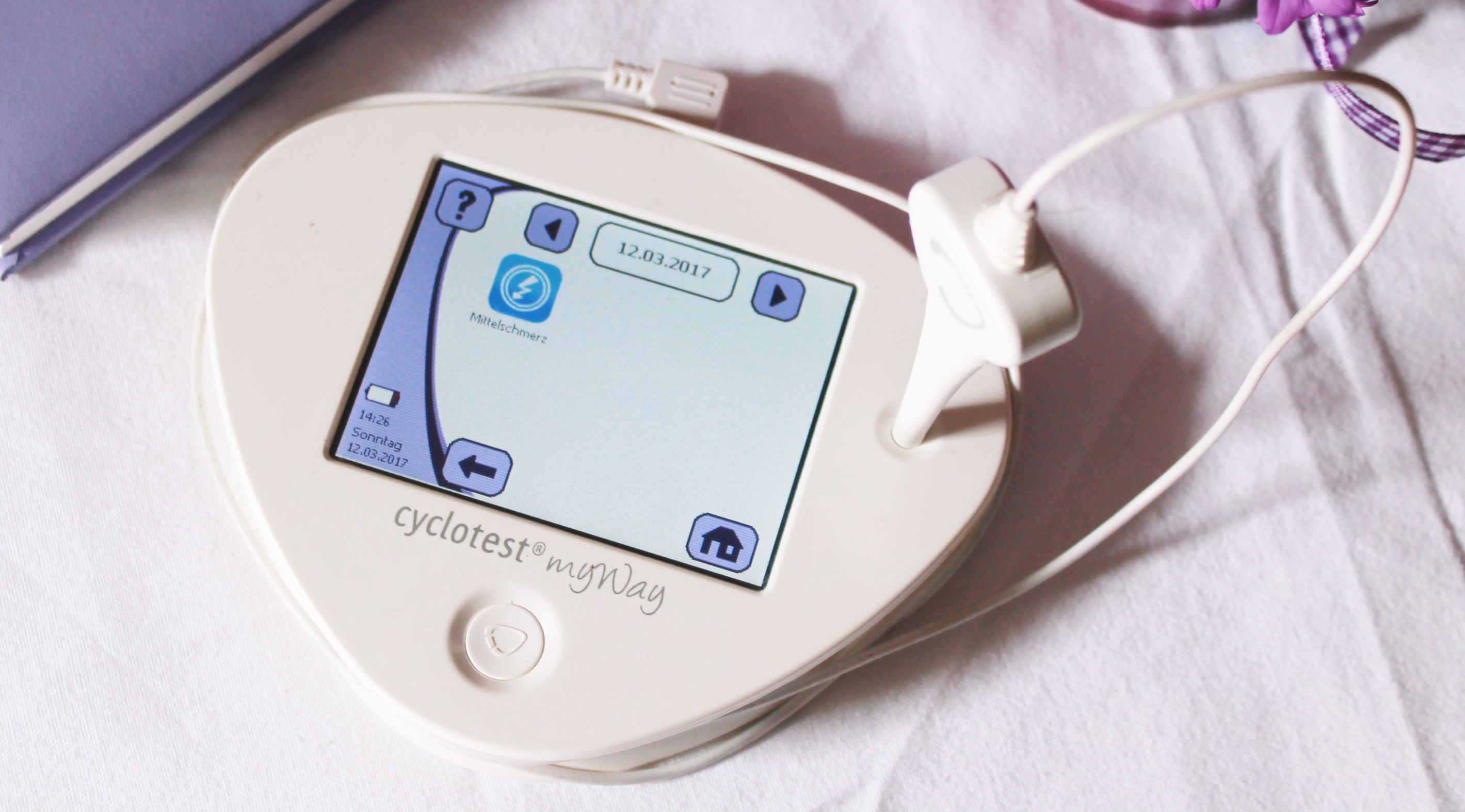
Fertility/contraception monitor

A fertility monitor is an electronic device which may use various methods to assist the user with fertility awareness. A fertility monitor may analyze changes in hormone levels in urine, basal body temperature, electrical resistance of saliva and vaginal fluids, or a combination of these methods. These devices may assist in pregnancy achievement. An updated 2023 Cochrane review has found that the use of urine ovulation test probably improves life births in women under 40 but that further study on risk and benefits is needed on timed intercourse via the use of these test.

==== Daily ultrasound ====
Daily ultrasounds are used to follow the development of follicles which can help predict ovulation. The ultrasounds can predict ovulation with a 24-hour overlap to actual ovulation.

==== Serum progesterone ====
Serum progesterone level is measured during the mid-luteal phase of the menstrual cycle. In women who are experiencing infertility, this test is only somewhat helpful for predicting ovulation.

==== Cervical position ====
The cervix becomes soft, high, open and wet during the fertile window.

==== Basal body temperature charting ====
Basal body temperature changes during the menstrual cycle. Higher levels of progesterone released during the menstrual cycle causes an abrupt increase in basal body temperature by 0.5 °C to 1 °C at the time of ovulation. This enables identification of the fertile window through the use of commercial thermometers. This test can also indicate if there are issues with ovulation.

==== Calendar methods ====
In women who have regular menstrual cycles, the fertile window occurs at approximately the same time every month. If the first day of menses is considered day 1, then ovulation occurs around day 14. In regular cycles that are 26–32 days long, the fertile window occurs on days 8–19.

=== Diagnostic testing for infertility ===
Women who are of fertile age may be infertile for a number of reasons. Various diagnostic tests are available to establish reasons. Several diagnostic procedures and clinical instruments are used for to evaluate anatomical causes of infertility. Some use a combination of imaging such as an X-ray or ultrasound with a contrast agent to visualize anatomic structures within the uterus and fallopian tubes. An electronic, flexible scope with a camera can also be inserted through the cervix to display live images. A variety of hormones can be tested at different times in the menstrual cycle to determine the likelihood of different responses to stimulation for In vitro fertilization (IVF).

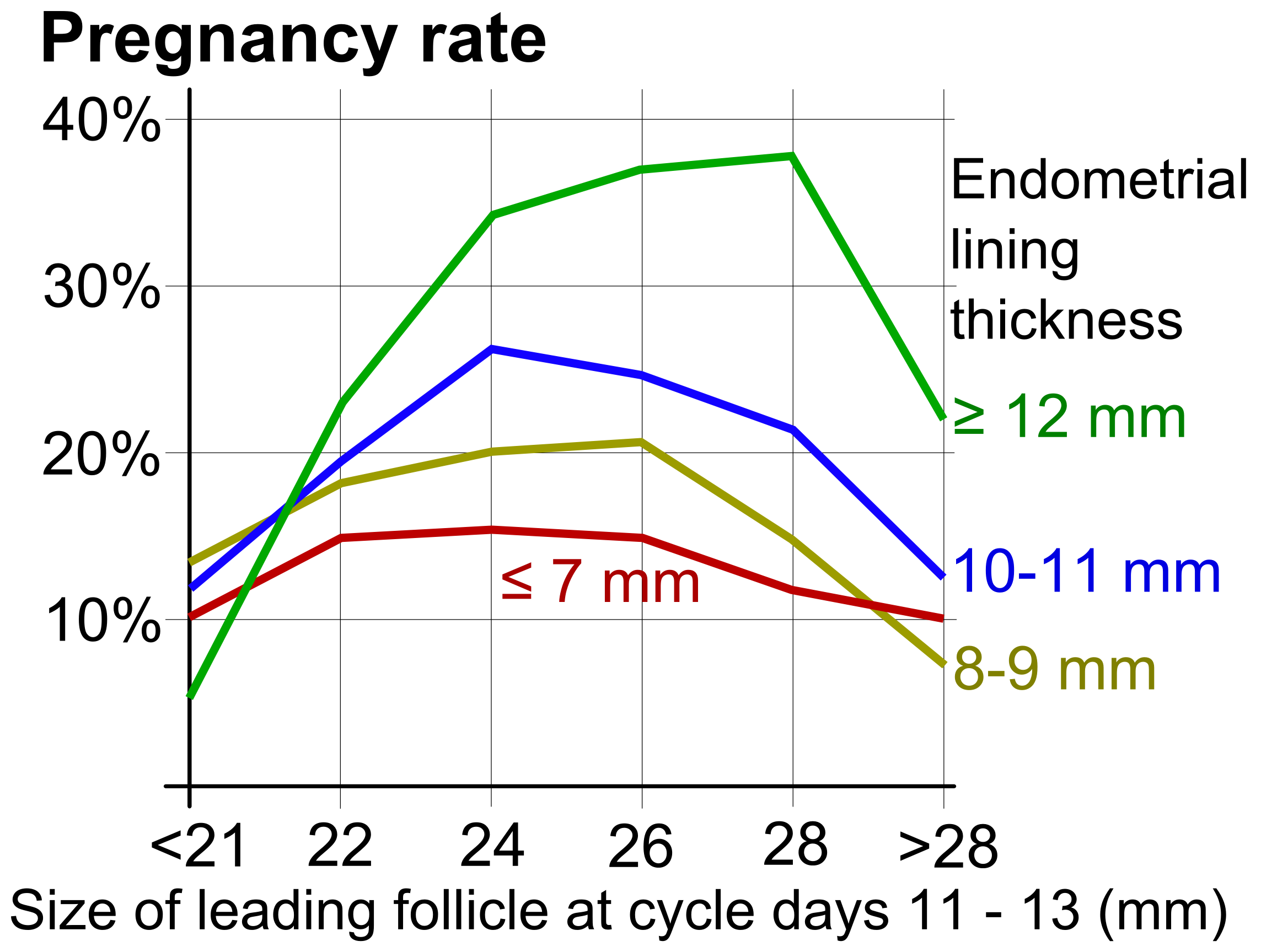
Pregnancy rates in ovulation induction when using antiestrogens, as functions of the size of the leading follicle as measured by transvaginal ultrasonography at days 11 – 13 (bottom scale), as well as the thickness of the endometrial lining (4 different curves).

Test	Method	Invasiveness
Anti-Müllerian hormone testing	Lab test	Blood draw
Cycle-day-three follicle-stimulating hormone (FSH) testing	Lab test	Blood draw
Clomiphene citrate challenge test (CCCT)	Lab test	Blood draw
Antral follicle count	Ultrasound imaging	Non-invasive
X-ray hysterosalpingography	X-ray imaging	Minimally invasive
Hystero contrast sonography (HyCoSy)	Ultrasound with contrast dye	Minimally invasive
Saline infusion sonohysterography (SHG)	Ultrasound with saline	Minimally invasive
Hystero foam sonography (HyFoSy)	Ultrasound with foam	Minimally invasive
Ovarian ultrasound	Ultrasound	Minimally invasive
Three-dimensional sonography	Ultrasound with 3D imaging	Minimally invasive
Hysteroscopy	Transvaginal endoscope	Invasive
Laparoscopy with chromotubation	Abdominal laparoscope	Invasive

==== Anti-Müllerian hormone testing ====
Anti-Müllerian hormone (AMH) is a glycoprotein hormone produced by granulosa cells in preantral and small antral follicles of the ovaries. Testing for plasma levels of AMH allows physicians to estimate ovarian reserve. Estimations of ovarian reserve help to determine the likelihood of pregnancy by In vitro fertilization (IVF). AMH testing is considered to be one of the most accurate estimates of ovarian reserve, can be used for assessment at any point in the menstrual cycle, and is non-invasive.

==== Cycle-day-three follicle-stimulating hormone (FSH) testing ====
Follicle-stimulating hormone (FSH) is a peptide hormone which causes the primordial follicles in the ovaries to develop and to produce estrogen. FSH levels are elevated early in the cycle of women who have lower ovarian reserve, because their follicles do not produce enough estrogen to inhibit FSH production, therefore high levels early on in a woman's menstrual cycle can indicate lower ovarian reserve and lower likelihood of retrieving eggs for IVF. To test for ovarian reserve in women with infertility, FSH levels are measured from blood samples taken on day three of the menstrual cycle and compared to standards to determine the likelihood of pregnancy after IVF treatment.

==== Clomiphene citrate challenge test (CCCT) ====
The clomifene citrate challenge test is similar to cycle-day-three FSH testing. To perform this test blood samples are taken on day three of the menstrual cycle to obtain FSH and estradiol levels, then 100 mg of clomiphene citrate are given orally once a day on days 5 through 9 of the menstrual cycle, and finally on day 10 of the menstrual cycle a second blood sample is taken to measure FSH levels. CCCT is not better at predicting ovarian response in IVF patients than baseline FSH on day 3.

==== Antral follicle count ====
Antral follicles are cells early in the process of developing from an oogonium into a mature oocyte. A physician may use a transvaginal ultrasound to visualize and count the number of antral follicles in each of a woman's ovaries in order to determine her ovarian reserve; however AFC is not predictive of embryo quality. A higher number of antral follicles indicates a higher likelihood of pregnancy by IVF.

==== X-ray hysterosalpingography ====
Hysterosalpingography (HSG) is an invasive x-ray imaging technique used to evaluate the shape and size of the uterus and openness of the fallopian tubes. It is a diagnostic test used in the investigation of infertility from genetic or infectious causes such as uterine fibroids, uterine polyps, uterine anomalies, scarring or tumors.

A HSG is performed after menses and before ovulation during the first half of a menstrual cycle. It is not performed if the patient is pregnant, has a pelvic infection, or heavy bleeding at the time of the test.

The procedure usually takes 30 minutes and often takes place in an outpatient setting such as a hospital or clinic. The patient is draped and positioned on her back as if for a pelvic exam with feet elevated. A speculum is used to visualize the cervix. The cervix is cleaned with an antiseptic and injected with a local anesthetic to minimize discomfort and pain. A small catheter is used to fill the uterus with an iodinated contrast dye. X-ray images are taken as the contrast dye makes its way through the uterus and fallopian tubes. After images have been captured, the catheter is removed and contrast dye may either spill outside of the vagina or become absorbed.

Risks associated with HSG are rare and include exposure to radiation, infection, allergic reactions to the contrast dye or antiseptic. It is normal for patients to experience mild to moderate abdominal cramping, pain and vaginal spotting for a few days after the procedure.

==== Hystero contrast sonography (HyCoSy) ====
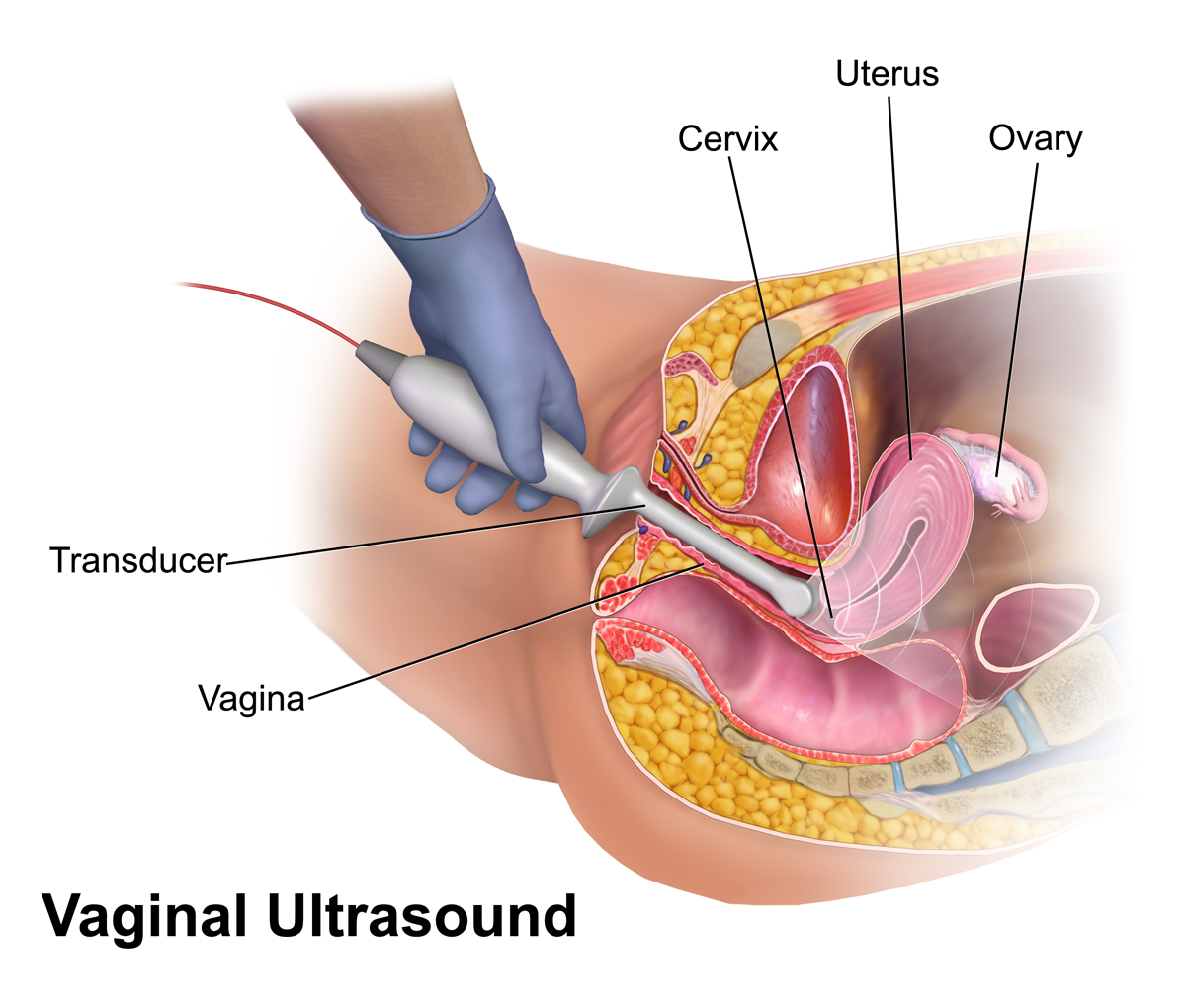
A vaginal ultrasound is used in Hystero contrast sonography (HyCoSy).

Hystero contrast sonography (HyCoSy) is a transvaginal ultrasound imaging technique used to evaluate the uterus, fallopian tubes and ovaries. It is a screening test used to determine the need for a diagnostic laparoscopy.

A HyCoSy is typically performed after menses and before ovulation during the first half of a menstrual cycle. Unlike a HSG, a HyCoSy can be used to investigate causes of heavy bleeding.

The procedure usually takes 15–20 minutes and often takes place in an outpatient setting such as a hospital or clinic. The patient is draped and positioned on her back as if for a pelvic exam with feet elevate. A speculum is used to visualize the cervix. The cervix is cleaned with an antiseptic such as iodine and injected with a local anesthetic to minimize discomfort and pain. A small catheter is used to fill the uterus and fallopian tubes with a contrast agent consisting of a galactose solution called Echovist to enhance visibility. A transvaginal ultrasound is inserted into the vagina and manually positioned to visualize the uterus, fallopian tubes, and ovaries. Once images have been captured, the ultrasound probe and catheter are removed. The contrast agent used during the study may either spill outside of the vagina or become absorbed.

HyCoSy does not carry the same risks as X-ray hysterosalpingography because it does not use radiation or iodinated contrast dye.

==== Saline infusion sonohysterography (SHG) ====
Saline infusion sonohysterography is identical in procedure to hystero contrast sonography (HyCoSy) but uses saline instead of a contrast agent.

A laparoscope is a minimally-invasive surgical technique used in infertility diagnosis.

==== Hystero foam sonography (HyFoSy) ====
An alternative to saline and Echovist, the galactose solution used to enhance visualization of anatomic features via ultrasound in HyCoSy, was needed because of limitations and high costs. A sterile gel foam designed for gynecological use paved the entry for a new technique called hystero foam sonography (HyFoSy). The gel offers more stability than saline and patients may experience less discomfort and fluid leakage.

==== Ovarian ultrasound ====
Ultrasound scans of the ovaries (optimally by transvaginal ultrasonography) may be conducted to establish the development of ovarian follicles. This can be useful particularly in the diagnosis of polyendocrine metabolic ovarian syndrome (PMOS).

==== Three-dimensional sonography ====
Three-dimension sonography is a 3D ultrasound technique that uses a series of 2D images to render 3D images of the uterus and fallopian tubes.

==== Hysteroscopy ====
Hysteroscopy is used to visualize the inside of the uterus using a thin, lighted, flexible camera that is inserted vaginally and through the cervix. The camera projects live images on an external screen. It is used to evaluate intrauterine causes of infertility.

==== Laparoscopy with chromotubation ====
Laparoscopy is a minimally-invasive surgical procedure in which a camera is inserted into the abdominal cavity via a small (0.5 – 1.5 cm) incision. It is often used to diagnose endometriosis. Chromopertubation is a combined laparoscopic procedure commonly referred to as a "laparoscopy and dye" test. It uses the injection of a blue dye solution (methylene blue or indigo carmine) into the uterus to help determine the openness of the fallopian tubes. Though considered to be a "gold standard" for diagnosing disorders of fallopian tube patency, it is an invasive procedure requiring general anesthesia.

== Men ==
Men who have gone through puberty should be fertile throughout life. The semen in ejaculate contains sex cells called sperm. After intercourse, sperm travel to the egg through the female reproductive tract, typically causing fertilisation to occur in the fallopian tubes.

Fertility testing for men involves semen testing and genetic testing, as other factors such as impotence are obvious. Semen can be tested for sperm count, sperm motility, sperm morphology, pH, volume, fructose content, oxidative stress, maturation assessment, DNA fragmentation and acrosome activity. Checks are also made to identify undescended testicles and retrograde ejaculation, along with medical history, such as cancer treatment, radiation, drug use, etc. In some cases the hamster zona-free ovum test may also be used to diagnose fertility. Genetic testing and chromosomal analysis can rule out some other causes of male infertility, such as Klinefelter syndrome.

A recent study identified epigenetic patterns in male sperm that may contribute to infertility.

=== Male Fertility Testing ===
Several diagnostic tests are used to evaluate male fertility by assessing sperm quality, function, hormone levels, and genetic integrity. These tests help determine the underlying causes of infertility and guide treatment strategies in assisted reproduction.

Semen Analysis (Spermiogram) is the standard test for evaluating male fertility. It measures key parameters such as sperm concentration (count), motility (movement), morphology (shape), volume, pH, and the presence of white blood cells or debris. The World Health Organization (WHO) provides reference ranges for normal semen values. This test is often the first step in male fertility assessment.

DNA Fragmentation Test evaluates the integrity of the sperm's genetic material. High levels of DNA fragmentation are associated with reduced fertilization rates, impaired embryo development, and increased risk of miscarriage. Tests such as the TUNEL assay, SCSA (Sperm Chromatin Structure Assay), and Comet assay are commonly used to measure DNA fragmentation.

Sperm Oxidative Stress Test assesses the presence of reactive oxygen species (ROS) that can damage sperm membranes and DNA. Excessive oxidative stress is a known contributor to male infertility. Tests like MiOXSYS and chemiluminescence assays are used to quantify oxidative stress levels and guide antioxidant treatment strategies.

Sperm Maturation Assessment evaluates the functional maturity of spermatozoa. Immature sperm may exhibit abnormalities in chromatin packaging, membrane composition, or the presence of residual cytoplasm. Techniques such as chromomycin A3 staining (CMA3), hyaluronic acid binding assayst, or nuclear protein transition studies are used to assess sperm maturity, which is important for successful fertilization and embryo development.

Hormonal Blood Tests are performed to evaluate endocrine function, which plays a critical role in spermatogenesis. Commonly measured hormones include:

- Follicle-stimulating hormone (FSH) – regulates sperm production.
- Luteinizing hormone (LH) – stimulates testosterone production.
- Testosterone – essential for sperm development and libido.
- Prolactin – elevated levels can indicate pituitary disorders.
- Estradiol and sex hormone-binding globulin (SHBG) – help assess hormone balance.

These tests can help diagnose hormonal imbalances, hypogonadism, or underlying endocrine disorders that may affect male fertility.

== See also ==
- Infertility
