= Salpingitis isthmica nodosa =

- Other names: Diverticulosis of the fallopian tube
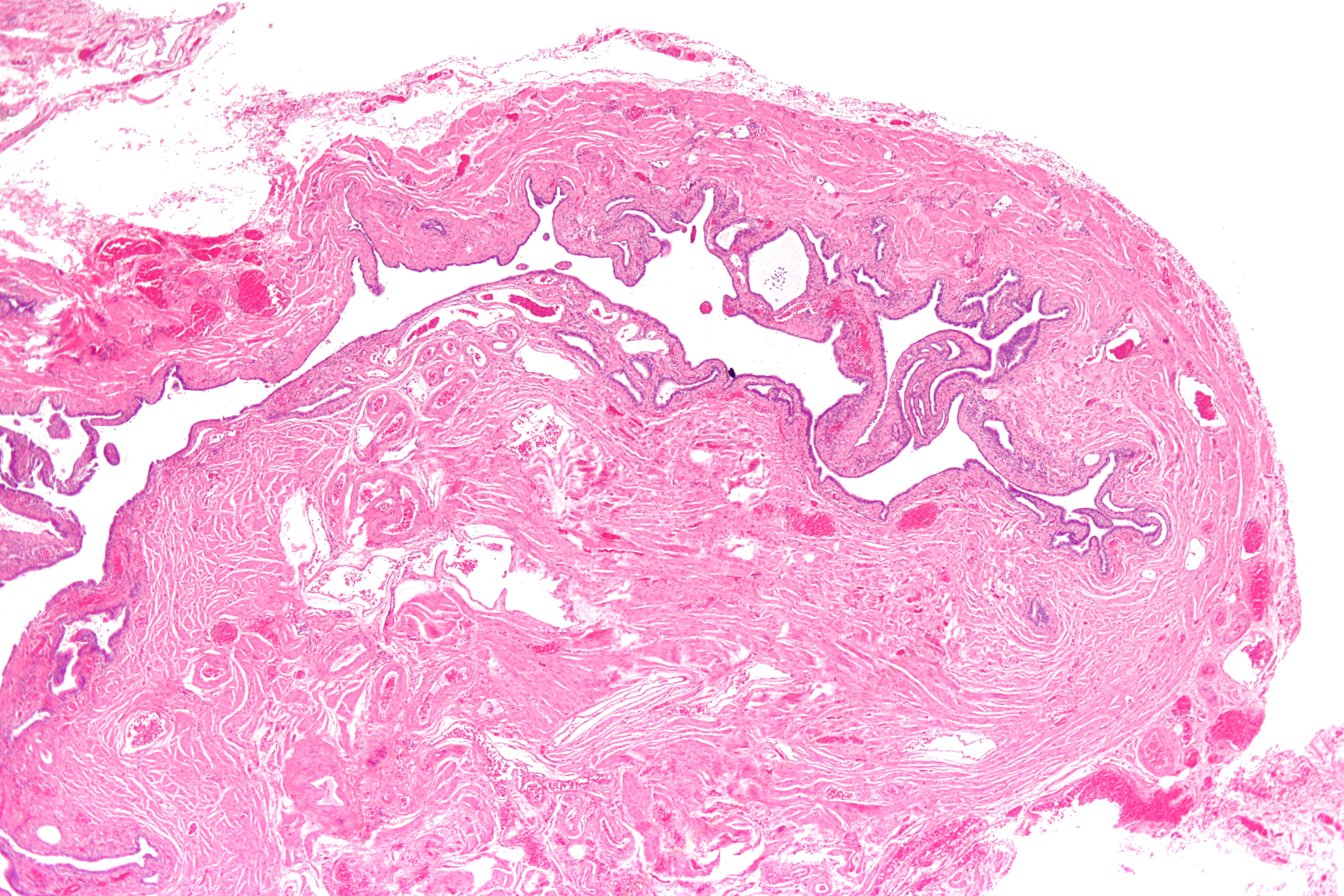
- Micrograph of salpingitis isthmica nodosa, showing the characteristic nodular thickening. H&E stain.
- Specialty: Obstetrics

Salpingitis isthmica nodosa (SIN), also known as diverticulosis of the fallopian tube, is nodular thickening of the narrow part of the uterine tube, due to inflammation.

== Signs and symptoms ==
SIN is associated with infertility and ectopic pregnancy, and may present as either.

== Pathology ==
It is characterized by nodular thickening of the tunica muscularis of the narrow (isthmic) portion of the fallopian tube. In severe cases, it leads to complete obliteration of the tubal lumen. It is uncommonly bilateral.

Gross findings:

1. One or more nodules 1–2 mm, spanning up to 2 cm
2. Smooth serosa

Microscopic findings:

1. Glandular epithelium within tubal muscularis propria, in continuation with mucosa or (more commonly) discontinuous
2. Haphazard distribution (akin to adenomyosis) or pseudoinfiltrative
3. Banal epithelium with tubal differentiation

== Diagnosis ==
Hysterosalpingography, a common technique in the work-up of infertility, is reliable in the diagnosis of SIN, which is seen as small globular collections within the tubal wall, either discontinuous or in continuity with the tubal lumen. Tubal obstruction and hydrosalpinx are commonly seen as well. Other techniques include laparoscopic chromopertubation, salpingoscopy, and transvaginal hydrolaparoscopy (the latter allows visualization of the tubal mucosa)

== Treatment ==
Once suspected clinically and radiologically, patients with infertility and SIN can be managed with segmental resection with tubo-cornual anastomosis, and recanalization if tubal obstruction is detected. Success with gonadotrophin-releasing hormone analogues (GnRH-a) has been documented in terms of remission of nodularity and tubal patency. If fertility preservation is not desired, salpingectomy is recommended.

== See also ==
- Vasitis nodosa
- Salpingitis
