= Hydrosalpinx =

Swelling of a fallopian tube with serous fluid due to blockage

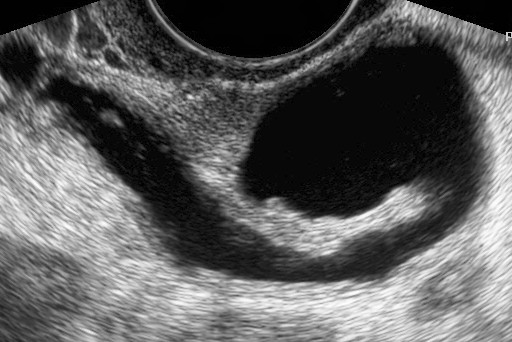
- Left hydrosalpinx on gynecologic ultrasonography
- Specialty: Gynecology

A hydrosalpinx (plural hydrosalpinges; from Greek ὕδωρ (hydōr) 'water' and σάλπιγξ (sálpinx) 'trumpet') is a condition that occurs when a fallopian tube is blocked and fills with serous or clear fluid near the ovary (distal to the uterus). The blocked tube may become substantially distended, giving the tube a characteristic sausage-like or retort-like shape. The condition is often bilateral and the affected tubes may reach several centimeters in diameter. The blocked tubes cause infertility. A fallopian tube filled with blood is a hematosalpinx, and with pus a pyosalpinx.

== Signs and symptoms ==
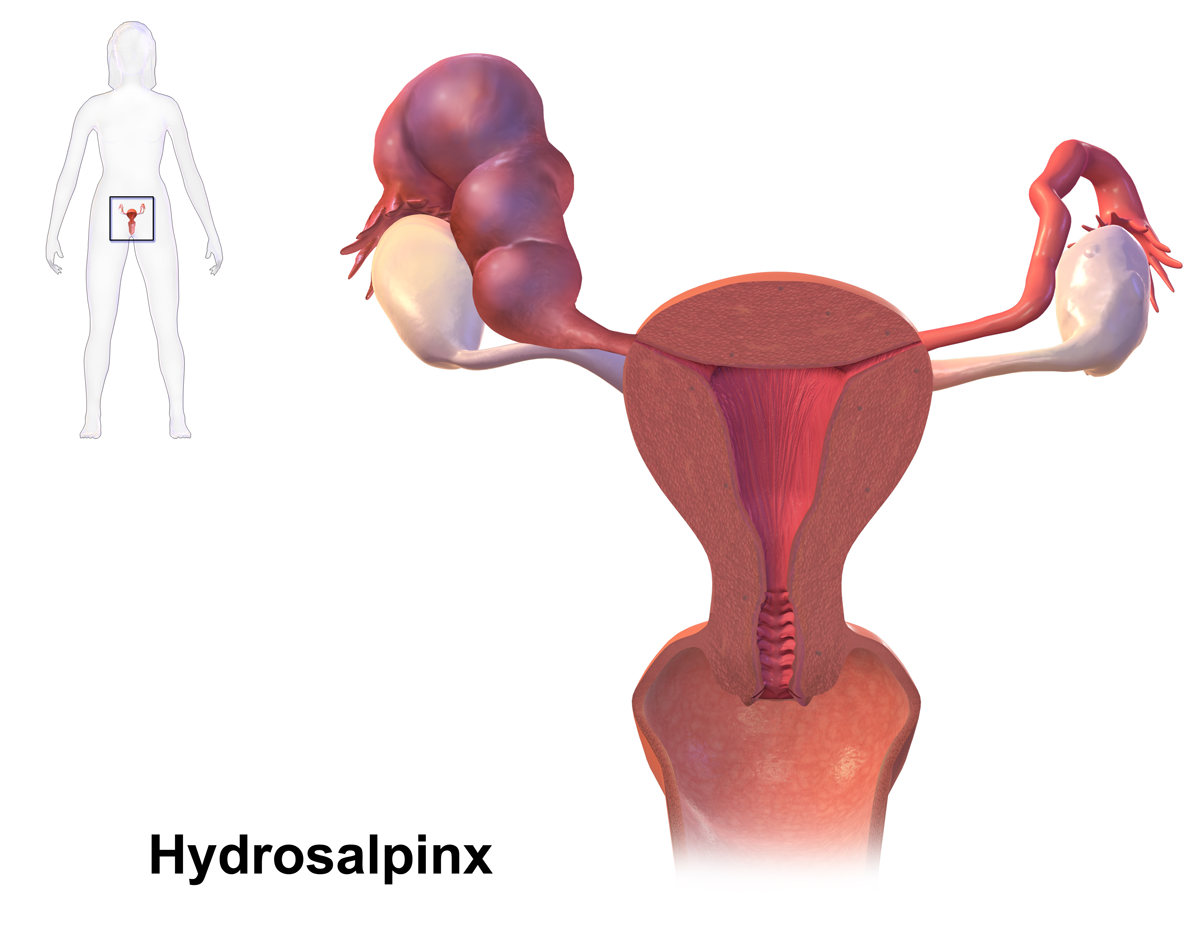
Hydrosalpinx

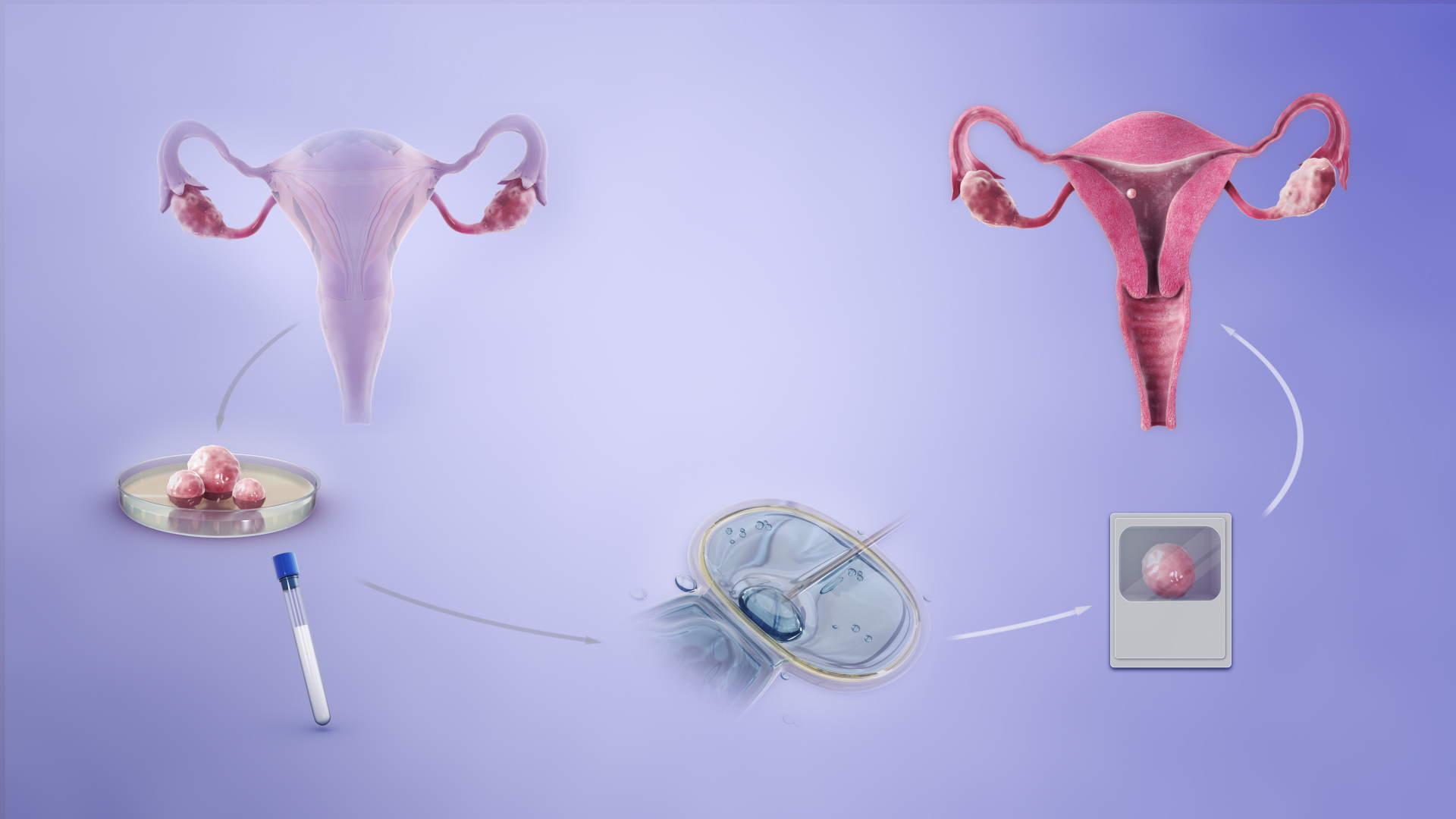
Post-ovulation the egg is collected from the woman's reproductive organs, fused with sperm and the resulting fertilized ovum is reinserted into the uterus.

Symptoms can vary. Some patients have recurring abdominal pain or pelvic pain, while others may be asymptomatic. Infertility is a common complication. Women who are not trying to get pregnant and have no pain, may go undetected.

Endometriosis, ruptured appendicitis, and abdominal surgery sometimes are associated with the problem. As a reaction to injury, the body rushes inflammatory cells into the area, and inflammation and later healing result in loss of the fimbria and closure of the tube. These infections usually affect both fallopian tubes, and although a hydrosalpinx can be one-sided, the other tube on the opposite side is often abnormal. By the time it is detected, the tubal fluid usually is sterile, and does not contain an active infection. (Not symptoms)

== Cause ==
The major cause for distal tubal occlusion is pelvic inflammatory disease, usually as a consequence of an ascending infection by chlamydia or gonorrhea. However, not all pelvic infections will cause distal tubal occlusion. Tubal tuberculosis is an uncommon cause of hydrosalpinx formation.

While the cilia of the inner lining (endosalpinx) of the fallopian tube beat towards the uterus, tubal fluid is normally discharged via the fimbriated end into the peritoneal cavity from where it is cleared. If the fimbriated end of the tube becomes agglutinated, the resulting obstruction does not allow the tubal fluid to pass; it accumulates and reverts its flow downstream, into the uterus, or production is curtailed by damage to the endosalpinx. This tube then is unable to participate in the reproductive process: sperm cannot pass, the egg is not picked up, and fertilization does not take place.

Other causes of distal tubal occlusion include adhesion formation from surgery, endometriosis, and cancer of the tube, ovary or other surrounding organs.

A hematosalpinx is most commonly associated with an ectopic pregnancy. A pyosalpinx is typically seen in a more acute stage of pelvic inflammatory disease and may be part of a tubo-ovarian abscess.

Tubal phimosis refers to a situation where the tubal end is partially occluded, in this case fertility is impeded, and the risk of an ectopic pregnancy is increased.

== Diagnosis ==
Hydrosalpinx may be diagnosed using ultrasonography as the fluid filled elongated and distended tubes display their typical echolucent pattern. However, a small hydrosalpinx may be missed by sonography. During an infertility work-up a hysterosalpingogram, an X-ray procedure that uses a contrast agent to image the fallopian tubes, shows the retort-like shape of the distended tubes and the absence of spillage of the dye into the peritoneum. If, however, there is a tubal occlusion at the utero-tubal junction, a hydrosalpinx may go undetected. When a hydrosalpinx is detected by a hysterosalpingogram it is prudent to administer antibiotics to reduce the risk of reactivation of an inflammatory process.

When laparoscopy is performed, the surgeon may note the distended tubes, identify the occlusion, and may also find associated adhesions affecting the pelvic organs. Laparoscopy not only allows for the diagnosis of hydrosalpinx, but also presents a platform for intervention (see management).

== Prevention ==
As pelvic inflammatory disease is the major cause of hydrosalpinx formation, steps to reduce sexually transmitted infection will reduce incidence of hydrosalpinx. Also, as hydrosalpinx is a sequel to a pelvic infection, adequate and early antibiotic treatment of a pelvic infection is called for.

== Management ==
For most of the past century women with tubal infertility due to hydrosalpinx underwent tubal corrective surgery to open up the distally occluded end of the tubes (salpingostomy) and remove adhesions (adhesiolysis). Pregnancy rates tended to be low as the infection process often had permanently damaged the tubes, and in many cases hydrosalpinges and adhesions formed again. Further, ectopic pregnancy is a typical complication. Surgical interventions can be done by laparotomy or laparoscopy.

Non-infertile women who suffer from severe chronic pain due to hydrosalpinx formation that is not relieved by pain management may consider surgical removal of the affected tubes (salpingectomy) or even a hysterectomy with removal of the tubes, possibly ovaries.

=== IVF ===
Among the main causes for female infertility, tubal factors account for 25-35%. In particular, hydrosalpinx is found in 10-30% of women with infertility; actually, this condition may impair fertility and IVF outcomes.

With the advent of IVF which bypasses the need for tubal function a more successful treatment approach has become available for women who want to conceive. IVF has now become the major treatment for women with hydrosalpinx to achieve a pregnancy.

Several studies have shown that IVF patients with untreated hydrosalpinx have lower conception rates than controls and it has been speculated that the tubal fluid that enters the endometrial cavity alters the local environment or affects the embryo in a detrimental way. Indeed, the presence of hydrosalpinx prior to IVF treatments, negatively affects pregnancy rates and increases the risk for spontaneous miscarriage. Even if the exact mechanism remains unclear, these effects could be ascribed to a combination of mechanical effects of hydrosalpinx fluid, toxic effects on the embryo and altered endometrial receptivity Thus, many specialists advocate that prior to an IVF attempt, the hydrosalpinx should be removed. However, the benefits seem to be higher when the hydrosalpinx is bilateral, visible on ultrasound, or both. Salpingectomy removes the chronically infected hydrosalpinx, decreasing the risk of infection after oocyte retrieval and increasing the accessibility to the ovary; anyway, it is a surgical procedure and it could also affect ovarian blood flow.

== History ==
Regnier de Graaf may have been the first to understand basic tubal function, describe hydrosalpinx, and link the development of hydrosalpinx with female infertility. The usually infectious cause of the process was well known to physicians by the end of the nineteenth century. With the introduction of hysterosalpingography (1914) and tubal insufflation (1920) its non-surgical diagnosis became possible. Surgery was gradually displaced by IVF as the main treatment for tubal infertility after the birth of Louise Brown in 1978.
