= Sonosalpingography =

Diagnostic procedure for evaluating fallopian tube patency

- Synonyms: Sonohysterosalpingography, hysterosalpingosonography, HyCoSy, HyFoSy, HyLiFoSy
- Purpose: evaluating patency of fallopian tubes

Sonosalpingography (SSG), also known as Sion test, is a diagnostic procedure primarily used for evaluating patency of fallopian tubes. It was introduced as a screening procedure for infertility investigations. It is becoming more popular among practitioners due to absence of side effects.

== Procedure ==
Under ultrasound scanning, a slow and deliberate injection of about 200 ml physiologic saline into the uterine cavity is accomplished via Foley catheter. An inflated bulb of the catheter prevents leakage of fluid outside uterine cavity. By visualizing the flow of saline along the tube and observing it as a shower at fimbrial end, tubal patency can be tested. Presence of free fluid in pouch of Douglas also confirms tubal patency.

== Uses ==
- For detecting patency of fallopian tube
- Detection of submucous fibroid polyp
- Detection of some intrauterine lesions
- Part of infertility investigations
- Investigation of amenorrhea, especially in Asherman's syndrome
- Investigating repeat pregnancy losses for uterine anomalies

== Eponym ==
The term 'Sion test' was popularized by Gautam Allahbadia after the popular government hospital in Sion, Lokmanya Tilak Municipal General Hospital, locally known as 'Sion hospital', where he invented the test.

== See also ==
- Gynecological ultrasound
- Hysterosalpingography
- Hystero contrast sonography
- Sonohysterosalpingography
