= Fallopian tube obstruction =

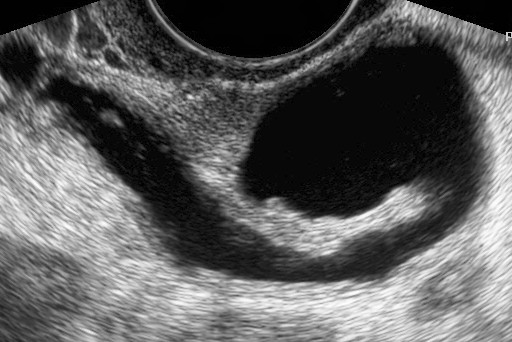
- The presence of a hydrosalpinx by sonography indicates distal tubal obstruction
- Specialty: Gynecology

Fallopian tube obstruction, also known as fallopian tube occlusion, is a major cause of female infertility. Blocked fallopian tubes are unable to let the ovum and the sperm converge, thus making fertilization impossible. In addition, obstruction may impair the transport of a fertilized egg to the uterus, increasing the risk of ectopic pregnancy when implantation occurs outside the uterine cavity, most commonly within the fallopian tube itself.

== Types ==
Approximately 20% of female infertility can be attributed to tubal causes. Distal tubal obstruction (affecting the distal tubal opening (towards the ovary)) is typically associated with hydrosalpinx formation and often caused by Chlamydia trachomatis. Pelvic adhesions may be associated with such an infection. In less severe forms, the fimbriae may be agglutinated and damaged, but some patency may still be preserved. Midsegment tubal obstruction can be due to tubal ligation procedures as that part of the tube is a common target of sterilization interventions. Proximal tubal obstruction can occur after infection such as a septic abortion.

== Causes ==
Most commonly a tube may be obstructed due to infection such as pelvic inflammatory disease (PID). The rate of tubal infertility has been reported to be 12% after one, 23% after two, and 53% after three episodes of PID. The fallopian tubes may also be occluded or disabled by endometritis, infections after childbirth and intra-abdominal infections including appendicitis and peritonitis. The formation of adhesions may not necessarily block a fallopian tube, but render it dysfunctional by distorting or separating it from the ovary. It has been reported that women with distal tubal occlusion have a higher rate of HIV infection.

Fallopian tubes may be blocked as a method of contraception. In these situations tubes tend to be healthy and typically patients requesting the procedure had children. Tubal ligation is considered a permanent procedure.

== Diagnosis ==
While a full testing of tubal functions in patients with infertility is not possible, testing of tubal patency is feasible. A hysterosalpingogram will demonstrate that tubes are open when the radioopaque dye spills into the abdominal cavity. Sonography can demonstrate tubal abnormalities such as a hydrosalpinx indicative of tubal occlusion. During surgery, typically laparoscopy, the status of the tubes can be inspected and a dye such as methylene blue can be injected in a process termed chromotubation into the uterus and shown to pass through the tubes when the cervix is occluded. Laparoscopic chromotubation has been described as the gold standard of tubal evaluation. As tubal disease is often related to Chlamydia infection, testing for Chlamydia antibodies has become a cost-effective screening device for tubal pathology.

Tubal insufflation is only of historical interest as an older office method to indicate patency; it was used prior to laparoscopic evaluation of pelvic organs.

== Treatment ==
Treatment of fallopian tube obstruction has traditionally been treated with fallopian tubal surgery (tuboplasty) with a goal of restoring patency to the tubes and thus possibly normal function. A common modern day method of treatment is in vitro fertilization as it is more cost-effective, less invasive, and results are immediate. Alternative methods such as manual physical therapy are also cited for the ability to open and return function to blocked fallopian tubes in some women. Treatments such as assisted reproductive technologies are used more often than surgery.

=== Tuboplasty ===
Tuboplasty refers to a number of surgical operations that attempt to restore patency and functioning of the fallopian tube(s) so that a pregnancy could be achieved. As tubal infertility is a common cause of infertility, tuboplasties were commonly performed prior to the development of effective in vitro fertilization (IVF).

Different types of tuboplasty have been developed and can be applied by laparoscopy or laparotomy. They include lysis of adhesions, fimbrioplasty (repairing the fimbriated end of the tubes), salpinostomy (creating an opening for the tube), resection and reanastomosis (removing a piece of blocked tube and reuniting the remaining patent parts of the tube), and tubal reimplantation (reconnecting the tube to the uterus). Further, using fluoroscopy or hysteroscopy proximal tubal occlusion can be overcome by unilateral or bilateral selective tubal cannulation, a procedure where a thin catheter is advanced through the proximal portion of the fallopian tube os to examine and possibly restore tubal patency salpinostomy (creating an opening for the tube) or falloposcopy.

Results of tubal surgery are inversely related to damage that exists prior to surgery. Development of adhesions remains a problem. Patients with operated tubes are at increased risk for ectopic pregnancy, although in vitro fertilization in patients with damaged tubes is also associated with a risk for ectopic pregnancy.

=== In vitro fertilization ===
In vitro fertilisation is a process by which an egg is fertilised by sperm outside the body: in vitro. IVF is a major treatment for infertility when other methods of assisted reproductive technology have failed. The process involves monitoring a woman's ovulatory process, removing ovum or ova (egg or eggs) from the woman's ovaries and letting sperm fertilise them in a fluid medium in a laboratory. When a woman's natural cycle is monitored to collect a naturally selected ovum (egg) for fertilisation, it is known as natural cycle IVF. The fertilised egg (zygote) is then transferred to the patient's uterus with the intention of establishing a successful pregnancy.

While IVF therapy has largely replaced tubal surgery in the treatment of infertility, the presence of hydrosalpinx is a detriment to IVF success. It has been recommended that prior to IVF, laparoscopic surgery should be done to either block or remove hydrosalpinges.

== See also ==
- Sonohysterosalpingography
- Chromopertubation
