= Isidor Clinton Rubin =

American gynecologist (1883–1958)

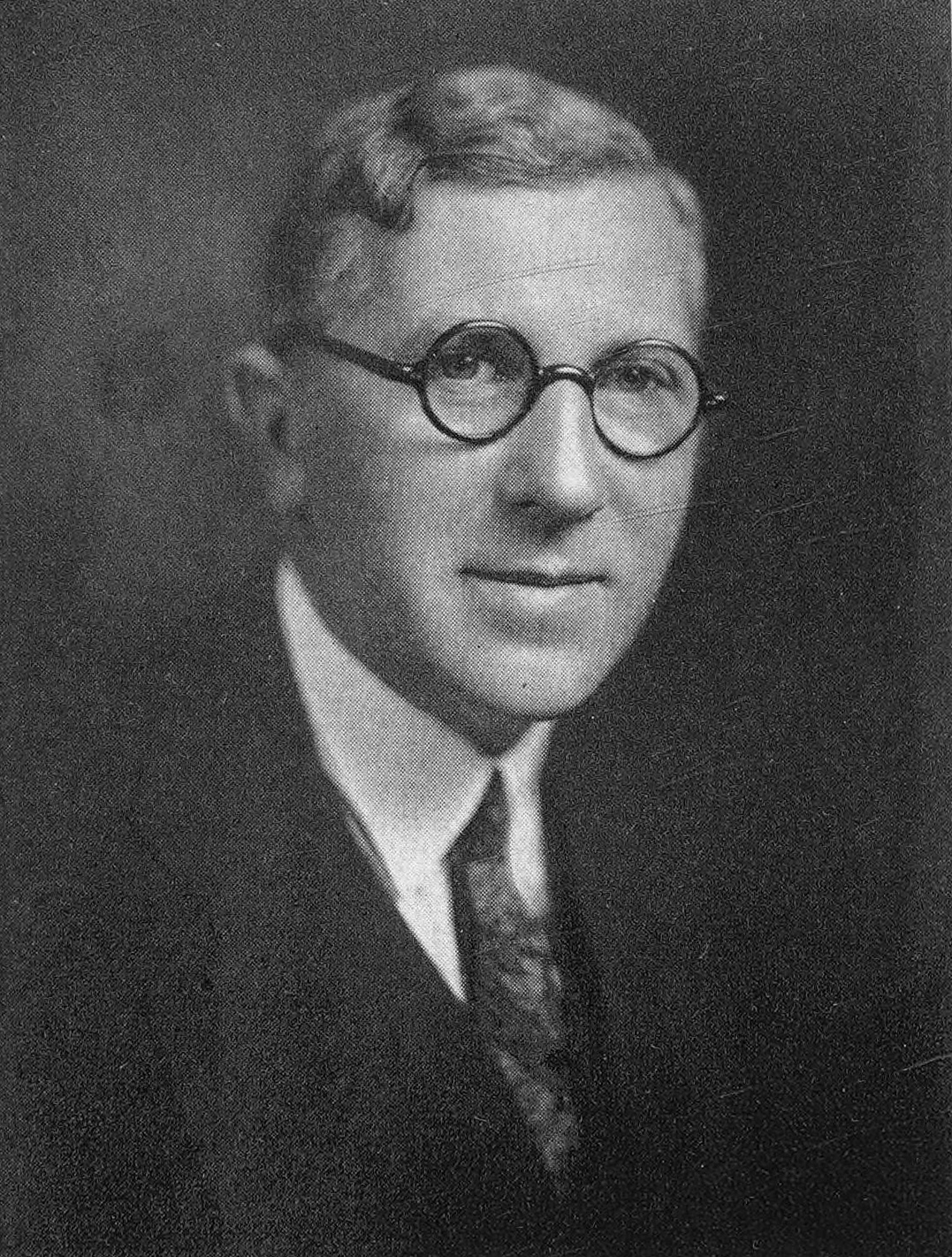
Rubin in an undated photograph

Isidor Clinton Rubin (January 8, 1883 in Germany – July 10, 1958 in London) was an American gynecologist who developed the Rubin test, a tubal insufflation test. This is an office procedure to check for tubal patency in the infertility investigation.

== Biography ==
Although Rubin was born in Friedrichshof, a small place in Prussia, he usually told people that he was born in Vienna. Rubin's parents were Nehemiah Rubin and his wife Froma, née Keller. He came to America at an early age, was educated at the City College of New York and received his medical degree from Columbia University in 1905. He then trained for three years at The Mount Sinai Hospital. In 1909, he went to Vienna to work for one year in Schottländer's laboratory of gynecologic pathology at the II Universität-Frauenklinik. In 1914, the year he married Sylvia Unterberg, he returned to Vienna to study under Ernst Wertheim. Back in New York, he joined the staff of Mount Sinai Hospital and Beth Israel Hospital. From 1937 to 1948 he was a clinical professor of obstetrics and gynecology at Columbia University. He retired in 1945 from active service at The Mount Sinai Hospital and became a consultant. While attending a conference in London, Rubin died on July 10, 1958.

== Tubal insufflation (Rubin test) ==
Rubin maintained a private practice and was interested in infertility. Realizing that many patients suffered from tubal obstruction, he developed tubal insufflation as a non-operative method to evaluate the tubes. The instrument is based on the principle that under a certain pressure, gas can be pushed via the cervix and uterus through the tubes into the abdominal cavity where its presence can be detected by distension and other means. In cases of nonpatency increasing pressure is exerted until a threshold level is reached. For his first experiments in 1919 he used oxygen, later he switched to carbon dioxide as this insufflation medium is quickly absorbed, less painful and safer. His instrument and technique were later supplemented with a kymograph to record the pressure readings. The Rubin test became a standard test to check the tubes in the investigation of causes of infertility and was claimed to be able to open up tubes in some patients with tubal occlusion. In 1958, Speert stated that "many gynecologists regard it as the twentieth century's most important contribution to the clinical study of female infertility." However, with the advancement of other techniques, notably laparoscopy, within the next two decades, the Rubin test lost its importance and it is not mentioned in contemporary textbooks.

== Other contributions ==
Among other contributions to gynecology were his observations regarding the early development of cervical cancer. He was one of the first to use hysterosalpingography in the diagnosis of tubal and uterine disorders. His studies on ectopic pregnancy laid down the principles to identify a cervical pregnancy that became known as Rubin's criteria.

== Books ==
- Rubin IC. Uterotubal Insufflation. CV Mosby Co, St. Louis, 1947.
- Rubin IC. Symptoms in Gynecology, 1923.
- Rubin IC, Novak J. Integrated Gynecology, McGraw-Hill, New York, 1956.

== Awards ==
- In 1947, a special issue of the Journal of the Mount Sinai Hospital was dedicated to Rubin at the occasion of the 25th anniversary of the Rubin test.
- In 1957, a special issue of Fertility and Sterility – Volume 8, number 6 – commemorated his 75th birthday.
- Among the many honors Rubin received is the title of officer of the French Legion of Honour.
