= Tubal branch of uterine artery =

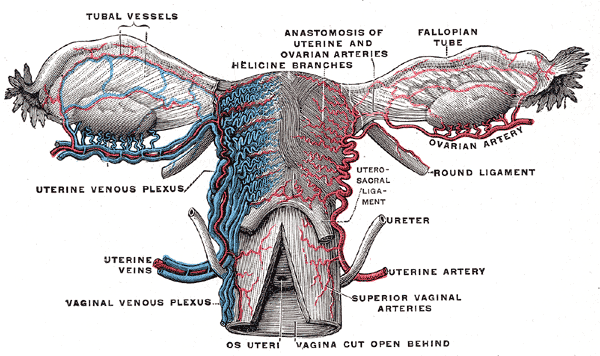
- Vessels of the uterus and its appendages, rear view.

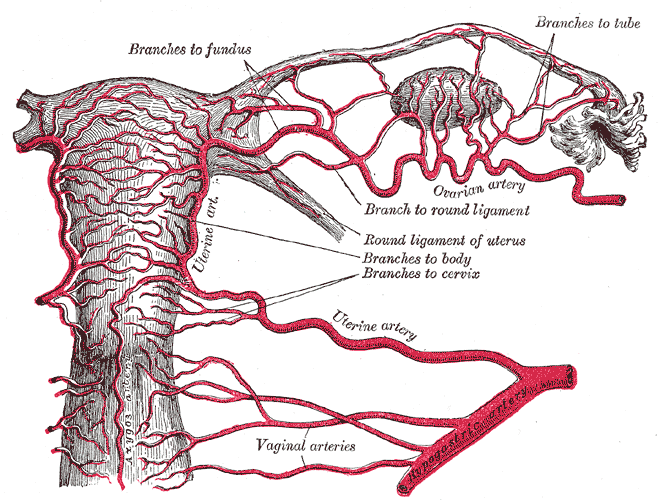
- The arteries of the internal organs of generation of the female, seen from behind.

Details
- Source: Uterine artery
- Supplies: Fallopian tube

Identifiers
- Latin: ramus tubarius arteriae uterinae
- TA98: A12.2.15.034F; A14.2.01.141
- TA2: 4335
- FMA: 18877

The tubal branch of uterine artery is an artery anastamosing with the tubal branches of the ovarian artery.
