= Tubal branches of ovarian artery =

Artery

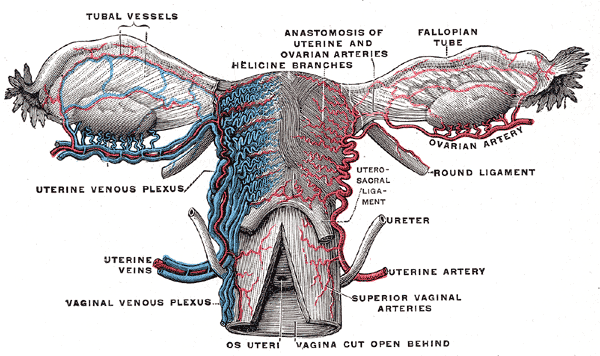
- Vessels of the uterus and its appendages, rear view.

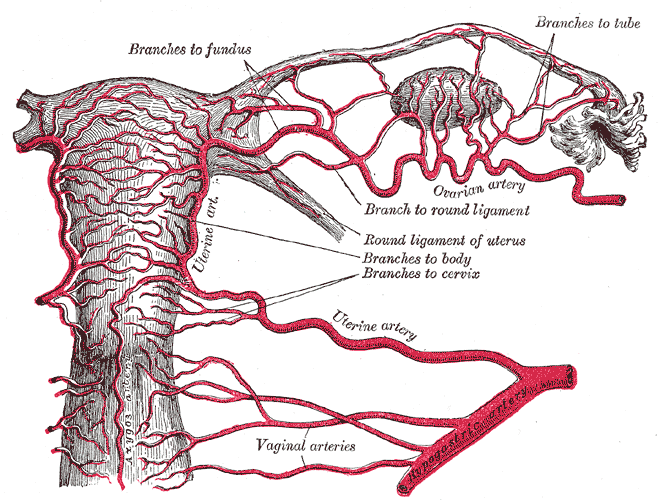
- The arteries of the internal organs of generation of the female, seen from behind.

Details
- Source: Fallopian tube
- Supplies: Ovarian artery

Identifiers
- Latin: rami tubarii arteriae ovaricae
- TA98: A12.2.12.088F
- TA2: 4287
- FMA: 75576

The tubal branches of ovarian artery are arteries providing blood to the fallopian tube.

It anastomoses with the tubal branch of uterine artery.
