= Uterine cavity =

Inside of the uterus

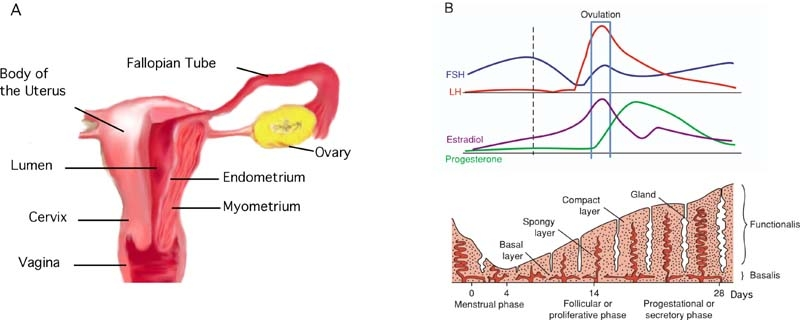
- Uterus and fallopian tubes, uterine cavity labeled as lumen

Details

Identifiers
- Latin: cavitas uteri, cavum uteri
- TA98: A09.1.03.007
- TA2: 3503
- FMA: 17745

The uterine cavity is the inside of the uterus. It is triangular in shape, the base (broadest part) being formed by the internal surface of the body of the uterus between the openings of the fallopian tubes, the apex by the internal orifice of the uterus through which the cavity of the body communicates with the canal of the cervix. The uterine cavity where it enters the openings of the fallopian tubes is a mere slit, flattened antero-posteriorly.
