= Tuboplasty =

- Specialty: Gynecology

Tuboplasty refers to a number of surgical operations that attempt to restore patency and functioning of the fallopian tube(s) so that a pregnancy could be achieved. As tubal infertility is a common cause of infertility, tuboplasties were commonly performed prior to the development of effective in vitro fertilization (IVF) or repair of any type of tube-like structure, including the Eustachian tube in the head and neck.

== Types ==
Different types of tuboplasty can be distinguished:

- Tubal reanastomosis, involves resection of occluded tubal tissue and joining the healthy segments.
- Fimbrioplasty, separating agglutinated fimbriae.
- Salpingostomy, creating a new distal opening for the tube.
- Salpingolysis, removing adhesions from around the tube.
- Cornual implantation, resecting of an occluded transmural segment of the tube and connecting the distal patent segment of the tube to the uterus so that it links up with the endometrial cavity.

== Techniques ==
Above surgical procedures are performed through either a laparotomy or laparoscopy approach. Techniques include the use of microsurgery, laser, electrocautery, hydrodissection, mechanical dissection, and use of surgical stents, hoods, adhesions barriers, and more.

Results depend on the underlying pathology and the skill of the surgeon. Pregnancy rates may range from 0–48% (Rock, 1985).

Ectopic pregnancy is a complication after a tuboplasty. It may require a salpingectomy (removal of a tube).

== History ==
Schroder is credited to have performed the first tuboplasty when he created an ampullary cuff and thus reopened an occluded tube in 1884. The first postoperative pregnancy was reported by Martin in 1891, however it aborted. For about a century tuboplastic procedures were the main approach to correct tubal infertility situations. With the development of IVF technology, IVF has increasingly supplanted tuboplasty as a treatment for tubal infertility.

== See also ==
- Fallopian tube obstruction
