= Chlamydia antibodies =

Chlamydia antibodies are antibodies targeting bacteria of the genus Chlamydia, but it generally refers specifically to antibodies targeting Chlamydia trachomatis, which is the cause of chlamydia infection in humans.

== Usage ==
Testing for chlamydia antibodies is not the mainstay diagnostic tool for chlamydia infection, which is preferentially diagnosed by nucleic acid amplification tests (NAAT) such as polymerase chain reaction (PCR).

However, testing for chlamydia antibodies is a cost-effective screening device in detecting fallopian tube pathology, as it is often related to chlamydia infection. The preferred technique for this purpose is by micro-immunofluorescence (MIF), because it is superior in the assessment of tubal pathology when compared with immunofluorescence (IF) or enzyme-linked immunosorbent assay (ELISA).
