= Salpingectomy =

Surgical removal of fallopian tube

- Schematic frontal view of female anatomy
- ICD-9-CM: 66.4-66.6
- MeSH: D058994

Salpingectomy is the surgical removal of one or both fallopian tubes, typically in the context of ectopic pregnancy, cancer—typically ovarian cancer—treatment and prevention, and as a form of contraception.

Salpingectomy is sometimes preferred over its ovarian tube-sparing counterparts because it provides a greater reduction in individuals' risk of ectopic pregnancy. For contraceptive purposes, the procedure is more or less an irreversible form of sterilization and more effective than tubal ligation, which can be surgically reversed.

== Classification ==
Salpingectomy differs from and predates both salpingostomy and salpingotomy. The latter two terms are often used interchangeably and refer to constructing an opening in the fallopian tube to, for example, remove an ectopic pregnancy, but the tube itself is not removed. Technically, the surgical construction of a tubal opening (Latin: os, 'mouth') is a salpingostomy, and incision into the tube to terminate an ectopic pregnancy is a salpingotomy.

== Indications ==
Salpingectomy was performed by Lawson Tait in 1883 in women with a bleeding ectopic pregnancy; it is now established as a routine and lifesaving procedure. Other indications for a salpingectomy include infected tubes (as in a hydrosalpinx) or as part of the surgical procedure for tubal cancer.

A bilateral salpingectomy will lead to sterility, and was used for that purpose; however, less invasive, possibly reversible procedures have become available as tubal occlusion procedures. Bilateral salpingectomies continue to be requested by some voluntarily childfree people over tubal ligation because it reduces the risk of developing cancer; this is called prophylactic salpingectomy. It can be performed non-electively on women who are at a high risk of developing ovarian cancer, as a preventative measure.

== Process ==
Salpingectomy has traditionally been done via a laparotomy; more recently however, laparoscopic salpingectomies have become more common as part of minimally invasive surgery. The tube is severed at the point where it enters the uterus and along its mesenteric edge with hemostatic control.

== Salpingo-oophorectomy ==
Salpingectomy is commonly done as part of a procedure called a salpingo-oophorectomy, in which one or both ovaries, as well as one or both fallopian tubes, are removed in one operation (a bilateral salpingo-oophorectomy (BSO) if both ovaries and fallopian tubes are removed). If a BSO is combined with an abdominal hysterectomy (there are different methods of hysterectomy available), the procedure is commonly called a TAH-BSO: total abdominal hysterectomy with a bilateral salpingo-oophorectomy. Sexual intercourse remains possible after salpingectomy, surgical and radiological cancer treatments, and chemotherapy. Reconstructive surgery remains an option for women who have experienced benign and malignant conditions.

== History ==
Salpingectomies were performed in the United States in the early 20th century in accordance with eugenics legislation. From Buck v. Bell (1927):

The Virginia statute providing for the sexual sterilization of inmates of institutions supported by the State who shall be found to be afflicted with an hereditary form of insanity or imbecility, is within the power of the State under the Fourteenth Amendment.

Buck v. Bell, while not expressly overturned, was implicitly overturned by Skinner v. Oklahoma (1942), in which the Court held that a person's choices whether to aid in the propagation of the human species was a cognizable fundamental right guaranteed under the 14th Amendment of the Constitution, a liberty retained by the people under the 9th Amendment of the Constitution.

== See also ==
- Tuboplasty
- Prophylactic salpingectomy
- List of surgeries by type
