= Hystero contrast sonography =

Ultrasound procedure

Hystero Contrast Sonography
- Synonyms: Sonohysterosalpingography, HyCoSy, HyFoSy, HyLiFoSy

Hystero contrast sonography (HyCoSy) is an ultrasound procedure intended to diagnose structural defects of the female reproductive system, such as blockage of the fallopian tubes. It is conducted as an initial transvaginal ultrasound followed by the introduction of a catheter to force an aqueous fluid up the fallopian tube to provide a contrast medium for ultrasound. This image demonstrates tubal patency indicating the possibility for sperm to swim towards the ovum, and for the zygote to migrate downwards towards the uterus, where it implants in the endometrium.

== See also ==
- Hysterosalpingography
- Gynecologic ultrasonography
- Sonohysterosalpingography
- Sonohysterography
- Sonosalpingography
- Infertility
