= Hysterosalpingography =

X-ray examination of the uterus and fallopian tubes

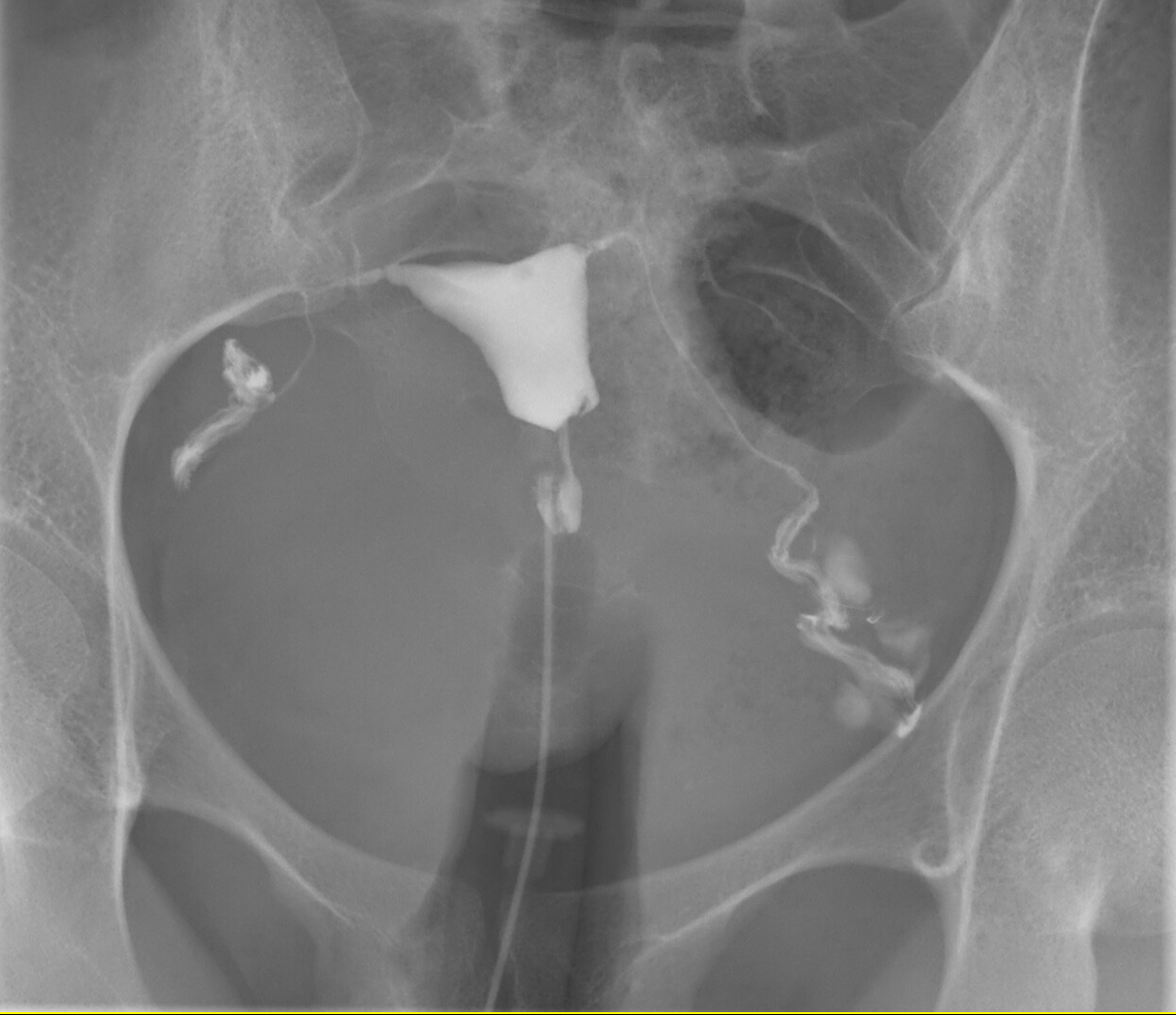
- A normal hysterosalpingogram. Note the catheter entering at the bottom of the screen, and the contrast medium filling the uterine cavity (small triangle in the center).
- Other names: Uterosalpingography
- ICD-9-CM: 87.8
- MeSH: D007047
- MedlinePlus: 003404

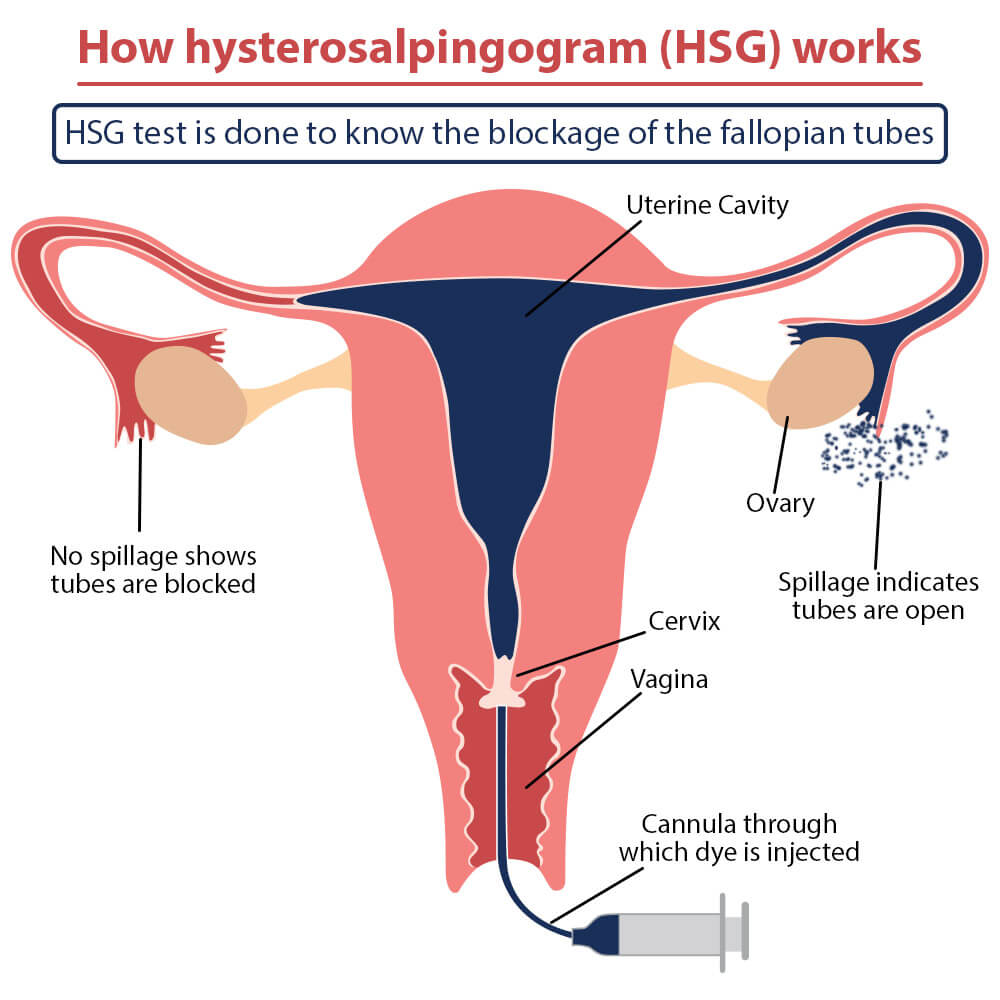
HSG test to know the blockage of the fallopian tubes

Hysterosalpingography (HSG), also known as uterosalpingography, is a radiologic procedure to investigate the shape of the uterine cavity and the shape and patency of the fallopian tubes. It is a special X-ray procedure using dye to look at the womb (uterus) and fallopian tubes. In this procedure, a radio-opaque material is injected into the cervical canal, and radiographs are taken. A normal result shows the filling of the uterine cavity and the bilateral filling of the fallopian tube with the injection material. To demonstrate tubal patency, spillage of the material into the peritoneal cavity needs to be observed. Hysterosalpingography has vital role in treatment of infertility, especially in the case of fallopian tube blockage.

== Uses ==
HSG is considered a diagnostic procedure. It is used in the workup of infertile females to assess the patency of fallopian tubes, assess the competency of the cervix or congenital abnormality of the uterus in multiple miscarriages, assess the patency of fallopian tubes after surgery or tubal ligation, or before reversal of tubal ligation. Rarely, HSG is used to assess the integrity of a Caesarean scar.

Occasionally, HSG may also have therapeutic benefits for infertility treatment. When oil-based contrast is used, rates of pregnancy increase by about 10% compared to water-based contrast. A meta-analysis revealed 3.6 times greater odds (OR = 3.6) of pregnancy with oil-based contrast compared to no hysterosalpingography. This effect is thought to be due to the flushing action of the contrast into the uterus that causes dislodgement of mucus plugs, debris, or opening of mild adhesions in the fallopian tubes.

HSG is contraindicated during menstruation, suspected cancer, pregnancy, unprotected sexual intercourse during the menstrual cycle, any purulent discharge from the vagina, or if the individual was diagnosed with pelvic inflammatory disease six months previously. For those with hypersensitivity to contrast, HSG is relatively contraindicated.

== Procedure ==
Either high osmolar contrast material (HOCM) or low osmolar contrast material (LOCM) can be used. 10 to 20 ml of LOCM can be used at a concentration of 270 to 300 mg/ml. The contrast media should be prewarmed to room temperature before administered into the cervix, so as to prevent spasm of fallopian tubes. 5Fr to 7Fr hysterosalpingogram balloon catheter can be used. Margolin HSG cannula is used if the cervix is narrow or stenosed. HSG appointment is usually made during the 4th to 10th days of regular menstrual cycle (follicular phase). The subject should not have undergone any sexual intercourse before HSG. Anxious subjects may need painkillers or other medications. Informed consent should be taken before the procedure.

The subject lies down on table in supine position with legs flexed and abducted. Vulva is cleaned with chlorhexidine or normal saline. A speculum is inserted to the vagina with the help of sterile jelly, and the cervix is exposed. The cervical opening is identified using a bright light. The HSG catheter is then inserted into the cervical canal. Occasionally, Vulsellum forceps may be used to hold the cervical lips open. If cervical weakness is suspected, the catheter should be left inside the lower cervical canal. Air bubbles should be expelled from the syringe and the catheter, otherwise it will cause confusion of interpretations on HSG. Contrast medium is injected slowly into the uterine cavity with intermittent fluoroscopic screening. If there are no spills from bilateral fallopian tubes bilaterally, intravenous buscopan and glucagon can be given to relieve spasm of fallopian tubes. Opiates should not be given, as it may increase pain because of increased smooth muscle contractions.

The procedure involves x-rays (fluoroscopy). Images are taken to demonstrate the filling of endometrial cavity, which shows full view of the fallopian tubes demonstrating the spillage of contrast material into peritoneum, the extent of the block if no spillage is present, or a delayed view in the case of abnormal cavities (locule) within. Subject may have vaginal spotting for one to two days, accompanied with pain that may persist for up to two weeks. Some medical centres routinely give prophylactic antibiotics before subject is allowed home.

== Complications ==
Possible complications of the procedure include infection, allergic reactions to the materials used, intravasation of the contrast material, pain during the procedure, nausea, vomiting, and headache. Some subjects may develop vasovagal syncope during the inflation of balloon in the cervical canal.

== History ==
For the first HSG, Carey used collargol in 1914. Lipiodol was introduced by Sicard and Forestier in 1924, and remained a popular contrast medium for many decades. Later, water-soluble contrast material was generally preferred as it avoided the possible complication of oil embolism.

== Follow up ==
If the HSG indicates further investigations are warranted, a laparoscopy, assisted by hysteroscopy, may be advised to visualize the area in three dimensions, with the potential to resolve minor issues within the same procedure.

== See also ==
- Hydrosalpinx
- Salpingitis isthmica nodosa
- Sonohysterosalpingography
