= Andrew W. Horne =

Scottish professor of gynaecology and reproductive sciences

Andrew Wemyss Horne is a Scottish clinical academic gynaecologist based at the University of Edinburgh.

== Education ==
Horne graduated with an MB ChB from the University of Edinburgh in 1994. Subsequently, he completed a PhD at Imperial College London in 2002, with research focusing on reproductive biology. He undertook postgraduate training in obstetrics and gynaecology, gaining clinical and academic experience in the field.

== Career ==
Horne is Professor of Gynaecology and Reproductive Sciences at the University of Edinburgh and serves as Director of the Centre for Reproductive Health. He is also an Honorary Consultant Gynaecologist with NHS Lothian and is Co-Director of EXPPECT, an initiative integrating clinical care and research for women with pelvic pain and endometriosis.

=== Research ===
Horne's research investigates the mechanisms and treatment of endometriosis, chronic pelvic pain, and ectopic pregnancy. His work includes laboratory science, translational medicine, and clinical trials, with a focus on diagnosis and the development of medical treatments for women's health conditions. He has served as principal investigator for research projects such as the ENDO1000 study, which applies machine learning to the diagnosis and treatment of endometriosis.

Horne has authored more than 200 peer-reviewed scientific articles and contributed to clinical guidelines in women's health. He is also a co-author of a patient-oriented book on endometriosis.

=== Media activity ===
Horne is active in media outreach, regularly providing expert commentary on women's health issues, particularly endometriosis and pelvic pain. He has contributed to public discussions and awareness campaigns through interviews and articles in both scientific and mainstream outlets.

== Professional roles and affiliations ==
- Director, Centre for Reproductive Health, University of Edinburgh
- Professor of Gynaecology and Reproductive Sciences, University of Edinburgh
- Honorary Consultant Gynaecologist, NHS Lothian
- Co-Director, EXPPECT Edinburgh
- Specialty Advisor to the Chief Medical Officer for Scotland (Obstetrics and Gynaecology)
- President of the World Endometriosis Society
- Trustee to Endometriosis UK
- Co-Editor-in-Chief, Reproduction and Fertility

== Honours and fellowships ==
Horne has been elected a Fellow of several professional bodies, including:

- Royal Society of Edinburgh (FRSE)
- Academy of Medical Sciences (FMedSci)

== Selected publications ==
Horne has authored or co-authored more than 200 scientific papers, with a focus on endometriosis, pelvic pain, and early pregnancy. His work has been widely cited in the field of reproductive health.
