= Cervical pregnancy =

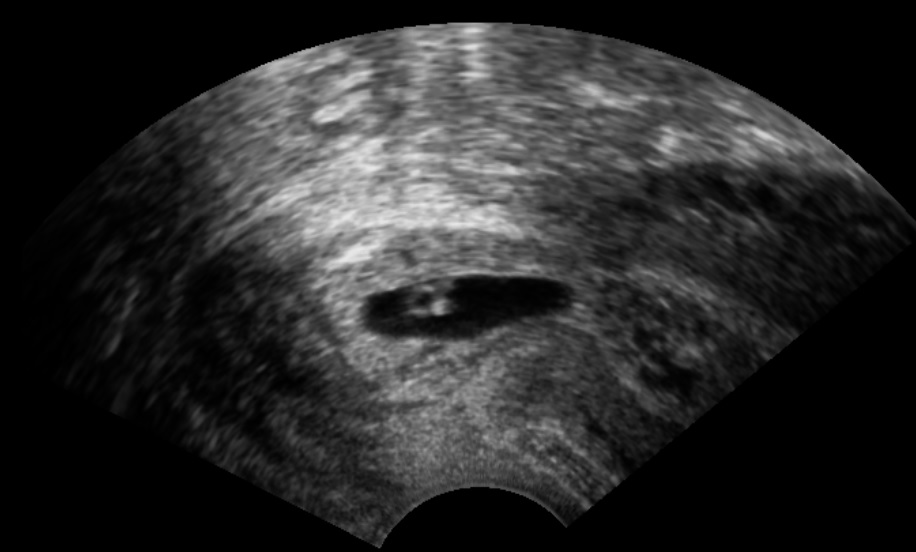
- Vaginal ultrasonography of a cervical pregnancy at a gestational age of five weeks. See image below for details of the visible structures.
- Specialty: Obstetrics

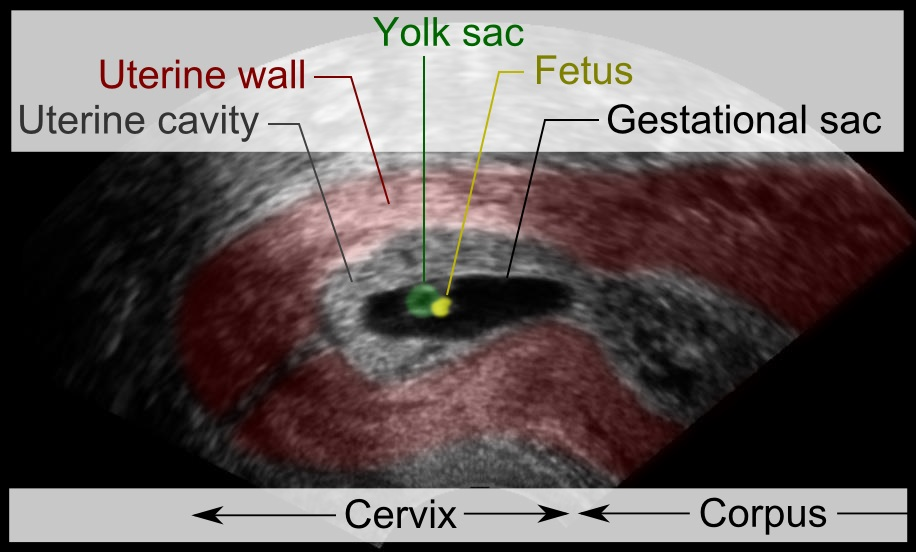

A cervical pregnancy is an ectopic pregnancy that has implanted in the uterine endocervix. Such a pregnancy typically aborts within the first trimester, however, if it is implanted closer to the uterine cavity – a so-called cervico-isthmic pregnancy – it may continue longer. Placental removal in a cervical pregnancy may result in major hemorrhage.

== Diagnosis ==
The diagnosis is made in asymptomatic pregnant women either by inspection seeing a bluish discolored cervix or, more commonly, by obstetric ultrasonography. A typical non-specific symptom is vaginal bleeding during pregnancy. Ultrasound will show the location of the gestational sac in the cervix, while the uterine cavity is "empty". Cervical pregnancy can be confused with a miscarriage when pregnancy tissue is passing through the cervix.

Histologically the diagnosis has been made by Rubin's criteria on the surgical specimen: cervical glands are opposite the trophoblastic tissue, the trophoblastic attachment is below the entrance of the uterine vessels to the uterus or the anterior peritoneal reflection, and fetal elements are absent from the uterine corpus. As many pregnancies today are diagnosed early and no hysterectomy is performed, Rubin's criteria can often not be applied.

== Management ==
True cervical pregnancies tend to abort; if, however, the pregnancy is located higher in the canal and the placenta finds support in the uterine cavity, it can go past the first trimester. With the placenta being implanted abnormally, extensive vaginal bleeding can be expected at time of delivery and placental removal. While early cervical pregnancies may abort spontaneously or can be managed with excision, D&C, suturing, electrocautery, and tamponading, by medication such as methotrexate, and/or by uterine artery embolization, a more advanced pregnancy may require a hysterectomy to control bleeding. The more advanced the pregnancy, the higher the risk for major bleeding necessitating a hysterectomy.

On very rare occasions, a cervical pregnancy results in the birth of a live baby; typically, the pregnancy is in the upper part of the cervical canal and manages to extend into the lower part of the uterine cavity.

A cervical pregnancy can develop together with a normal intrauterine pregnancy; such a heterotopic pregnancy will call for expert management so as not to endanger the intrauterine pregnancy.

== Epidemiology ==
The incidence has been reported to be about 1:1,000 to 1:16,000 pregnancies.

Pregnancies involving the isthmus – the segment of the uterus between the cervix and the fundus – are more common than true cervical pregnancies. While in many situations the cause of the abnormal implantation remains unclear, there is evidence to link the development of cervical pregnancy to uterine instrumentation, specifically repeated D&Cs (dilatation and curettage). Cervical pregnancies are to be distinguished from pregnancies that start from an implantation in a scar of a previous cesarean section, so-called scar pregnancies.
