= Indirect abortion =

Catholic term for medical procedure that results in abortion as a secondary effect

Indirect abortion is the name given by Catholic theologians to a medical procedure which has a beneficial medical effect and also results in an abortion as a secondary effect. Edwin F. Healy makes a distinction between "direct abortions" that is, abortion which is either an end or a means, and "indirect abortions", where the loss of the fetus is then considered to be a "secondary effect".

The relevant distinction may be between cases where the woman's life may be "in jeopardy", and cases where the woman would almost certainly die without the procedure that would also destroy the fetus. However, this does not mean the Catholic Church teaches that a direct abortion, even when intended to save the life of a woman, is not sinful.

== Humanae vitae ==
This view is also held in Pope Paul VI's 1968 encyclical Humanae vitae, which says that "the Church does not consider at all illicit the use of those therapeutic means necessary to cure bodily diseases, even if a foreseeable impediment to procreation should result there from—provided such impediment is not directly intended for any motive whatsoever". Paul VI quotes Pius XII in a 1953 address to the Italian Association of Urology. For example, the removal of a cancerous uterus is allowed if life at conception and beyond is not present in uterus, so removal of uterus is allowed but procreation is not possible when uterus is removed.

== As distinct from therapeutic abortion ==
According to Archbishop Jose Antonio Eguren in Peru, indirect abortion is not the same as a therapeutic abortion. Eguren asserts that indirect abortion is an extraordinary moral case which has nothing to do ‘therapeutic abortion’; in Catholic doctrine, therapeutic abortion simply does not exist, since abortion is never a cure for anything.

== Possible confusion with direct abortion ==
According to Elio Sgreccia, President of the Pontifical Academy for Life, a great number of indications for such abortions have lost their raison d'être. He further asserts that the progressive extension of these indications beyond the scope of medicine has often been driven by political reasons, part of which are related to the eugenics movement.

Tuberculosis, cardiopathies, vascular diseases, diseases of the hematopoietic system (some forms of anemia), kidney diseases, hepatic and pancreatic diseases, gastro-intestinal diseases, pregnancy-related chorea, myasthenia gravis, and tumors are all diseases claimed to be motives for indications.

However, a thorough study of each one of them shows that the medical basis of these motives is very limited, and that in the cases where, in the absence of a therapeutic alternative, there remains a real risk for the life or health of the woman, these cases are in a strong and progressive downward trend.

== Pope Benedict XVI speech in Angola ==
Pope Benedict XVI later gave a speech in Angola where he appeared to blur the distinction between indirect abortion and direct abortion. He condemned all forms of abortion, even those considered to be therapeutic. The Holy See Press Office subsequently reiterated the distinction between direct and indirect abortion, and commented that the allocution merely re-stated the Church's opposition to some sections of the gender-oriented Maputo Protocol.

== Indirect treatments ==
There are licit and illicit approaches in dealing with ectopic pregnancies. The most commonly addressed by Catholic bioethicists is extrauterine tubal pregnancies in which salpingectomy is seen with consensus to be indirect while some claim salpingostomy and methotrexate to be indirect.

Of the other 7-10% of ectopic pregnancies, there are interstitial pregnancy and cesarean scar pregnancy. Hysterectomy is the common treatment of choice for interstitial pregnancy with a loss of fertility.

The licitness of techniques for treating interstitial and caesarian scar pregnancy
Technique	Description	Summary
Expectant management	Awaiting embryonic or fetal death, or development of viable pregnancy	Questionable, licit in some cases
Systemic methotrexate	Antimetabolite interferes with DNA synthesis, prohibiting placental growth and also fetal growth	Questionable, likely illicit
Intragestational methotrexate	Antimetabolite administered directly into the amniotic cavity	Questionable, likely illicit
Intragestational KCl	Cardiotoxin injected into fetus or amniotic cavity leading to fetal death	Illicit
Double-balloon catheter	Compression of fetal body and placenta leading to cessation of blood flow and fetal death	Illicit
Uterine artery embolization	Occlusion of one or both uterine arteries to cut off blood supply to fetus or to decrease hemorrhage	Illicit when used to cause fetal death; licit when used to prevent hemorrhage
Dilation and curettage	Removal of products of conception in pieces through the cervix	Illicit
Cornuostomy	Perforation of the uterine cornu and removal of products of conception whole or in pieces	Questionable
Salpingostomy	Incision of the fallopian tube and removal of products of conception whole or in pieces	Questionable
Cornual wedge resection	Resection of an interstitial pregnancy and the part of the uterus enclosing it	Licit
Gestational excision	Removal of products of conception from a cesarean scar, whole or in pieces	Questionable
Scar excision	Resection of a cesarean scar pregnancy and the part of the uterus enclosing it	Licit
Scar revision (pregnancy salvage)	Reinforcement of the cesarean scar in order to promote viable pregnancy	Questionable
Hysterectomy	Resection of the entire uterus including the ectopic pregnancy	Licit, but generally to be avoided in order to preserve fertility, unless no other licit option is available
