= Cervical canal =

Canal of the uterine cervix

- Posterior half of uterus and upper part of vagina, showing cervical canal as "cavity of cervix"

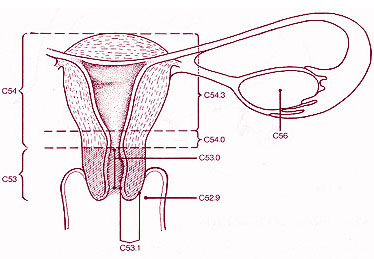

Details
- Synonym: Canal of the cervix, endocervical canal, cervical canal of uterus, cavity of cervix

Identifiers
- Latin: canalis cervicis uteri
- TA98: A09.1.03.018
- TA2: 3515
- FMA: 86485

The cervical canal is the spindle-shaped, flattened canal of the cervix which connects the vagina to the main cavity of the uterus in most mammals.

== Anatomy ==
The cervical canal communicates with the uterine cavity via the internal orifice of the uterus (or internal os) and with the vagina via the external orifice of the uterus (ostium of uterus or external os). The internal orifice of the uterus is an interior narrowing of the uterine cavity. It corresponds to a slight constriction known as the isthmus that can be seen on the surface of the uterus about midway between the apex and base. The external orifice of the uterus is a small, depressed, somewhat circular opening on the rounded extremity of the cervix, opening to the vagina. Through this aperture, the cervical cavity communicates with that of the vagina.

The external orifice is bounded by two lips, an anterior and a posterior. The anterior is shorter and thicker, though it projects lower than the posterior because of the slope of the cervix. Normally, both lips are in contact with the posterior vaginal wall. Prior to pregnancy, the external orifice has a rounded shape when viewed through the vaginal canal (as through a speculum). Following childbirth, the orifice takes on an appearance more like a transverse slit or is "H-shaped".

The wall of the canal presents an anterior and a posterior longitudinal ridge, from each of which proceed a number of small oblique columns, the palmate folds, giving the appearance of branches from the stem of a tree; to this arrangement the name arbor vitae uteri is applied.

The folds on the two walls are not exactly opposed, but fit between one another so as to close the cervical canal.

=== Histology ===
The cervical canal is generally lined by "endocervical mucosa" which consists of a single layer of mucinous columnar epithelium. However, after menopause, the functional squamocolumnar junction moves into the cervical canal, and hence the distal part of the cervical canal may be lined by stratified squamous epithelium (conforming to a "type 3 transformation zone").

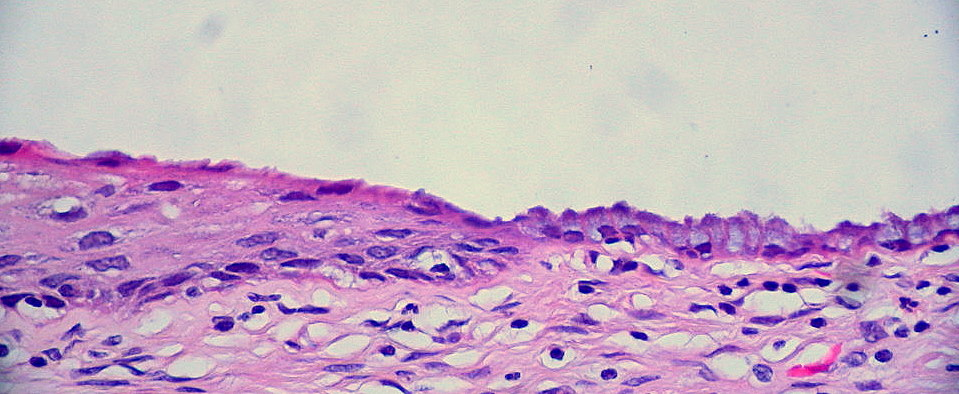
The squamocolumnar junction of the cervix: The ectocervix, with its stratified squamous epithelium, is visible on the left. Simple mucinous columnar epithelium, typical of the endocervix, is visible on the right. A layer of connective tissue is visible under both types of epithelium.

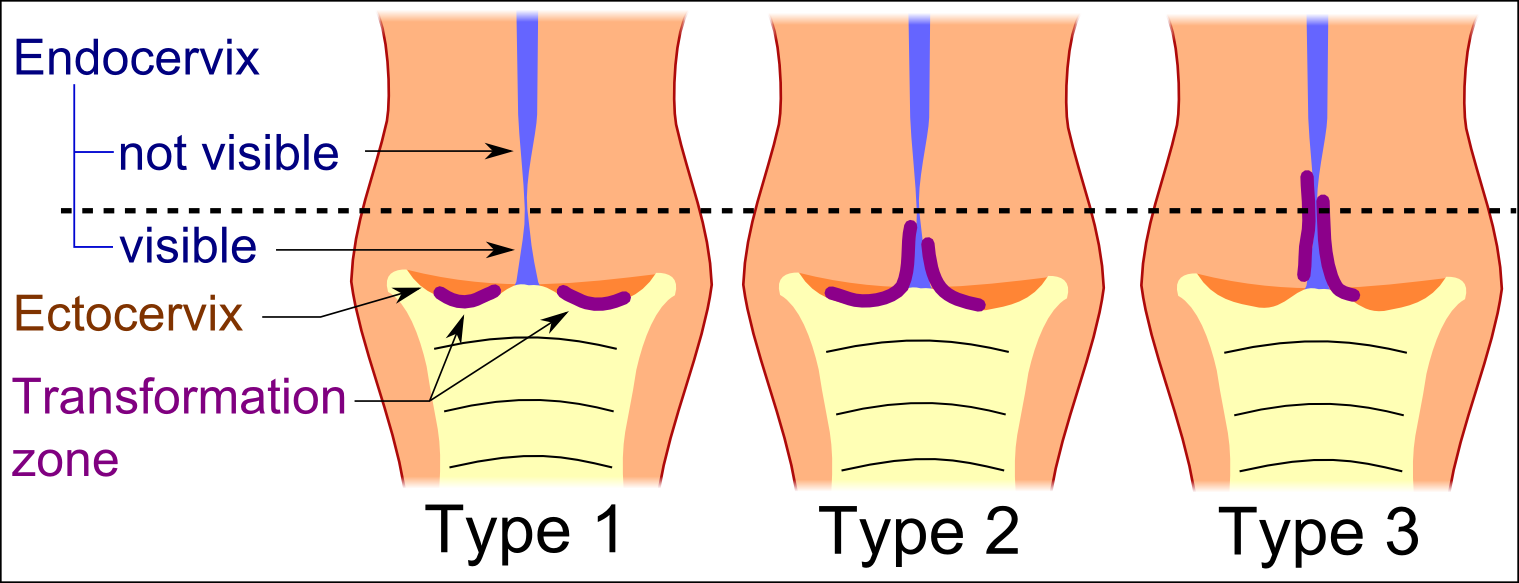
Transformation zone types:
Type 1: Completely ectocervical (common under hormonal influence).
Type 2: Endocervical component but fully visible (common before puberty).
Type 3: Endocervical component, not fully visible (common after menopause).

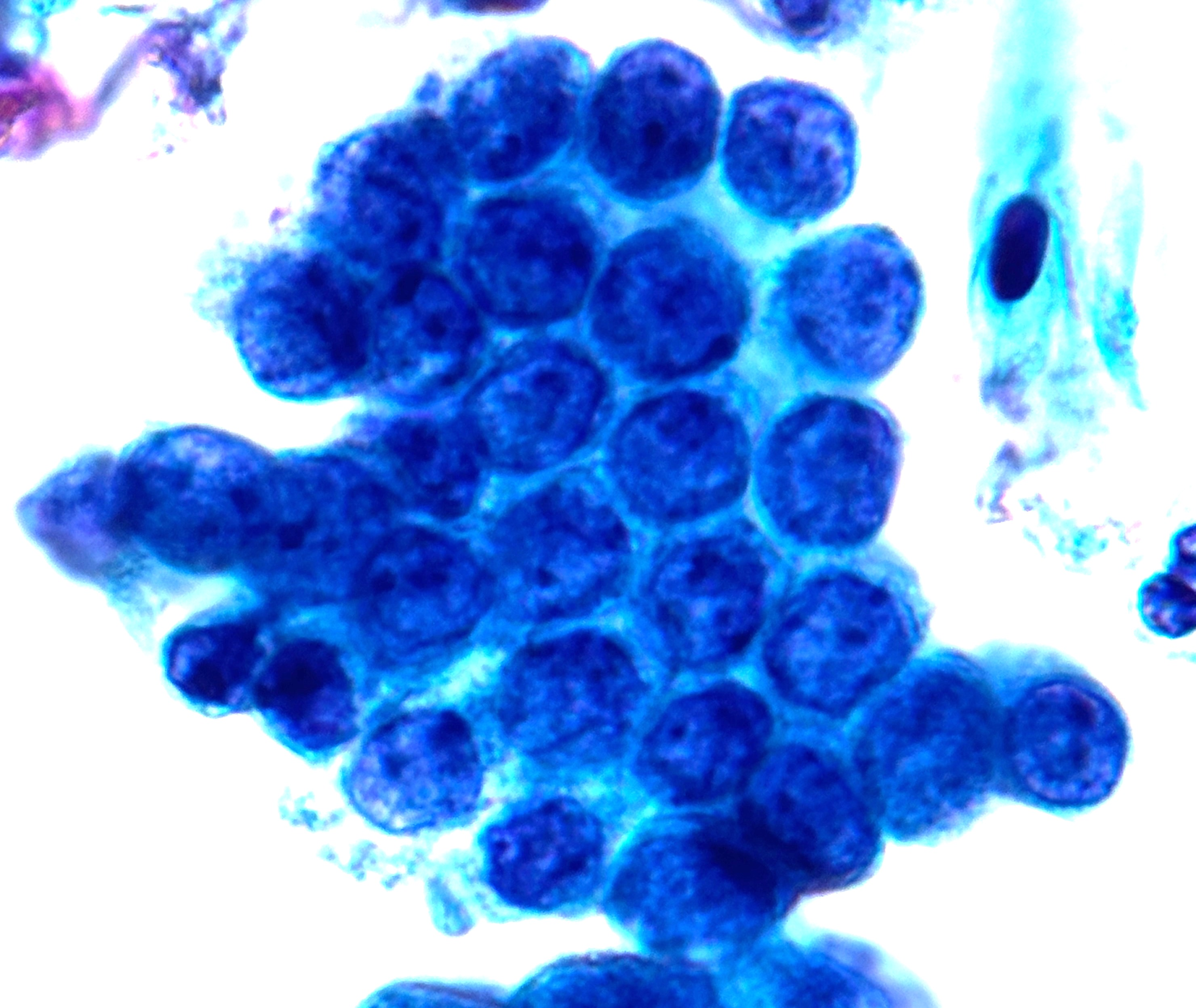
Endocervical cells on Pap test, appearing as sheets with a honeycomb pattern

== Pathology ==
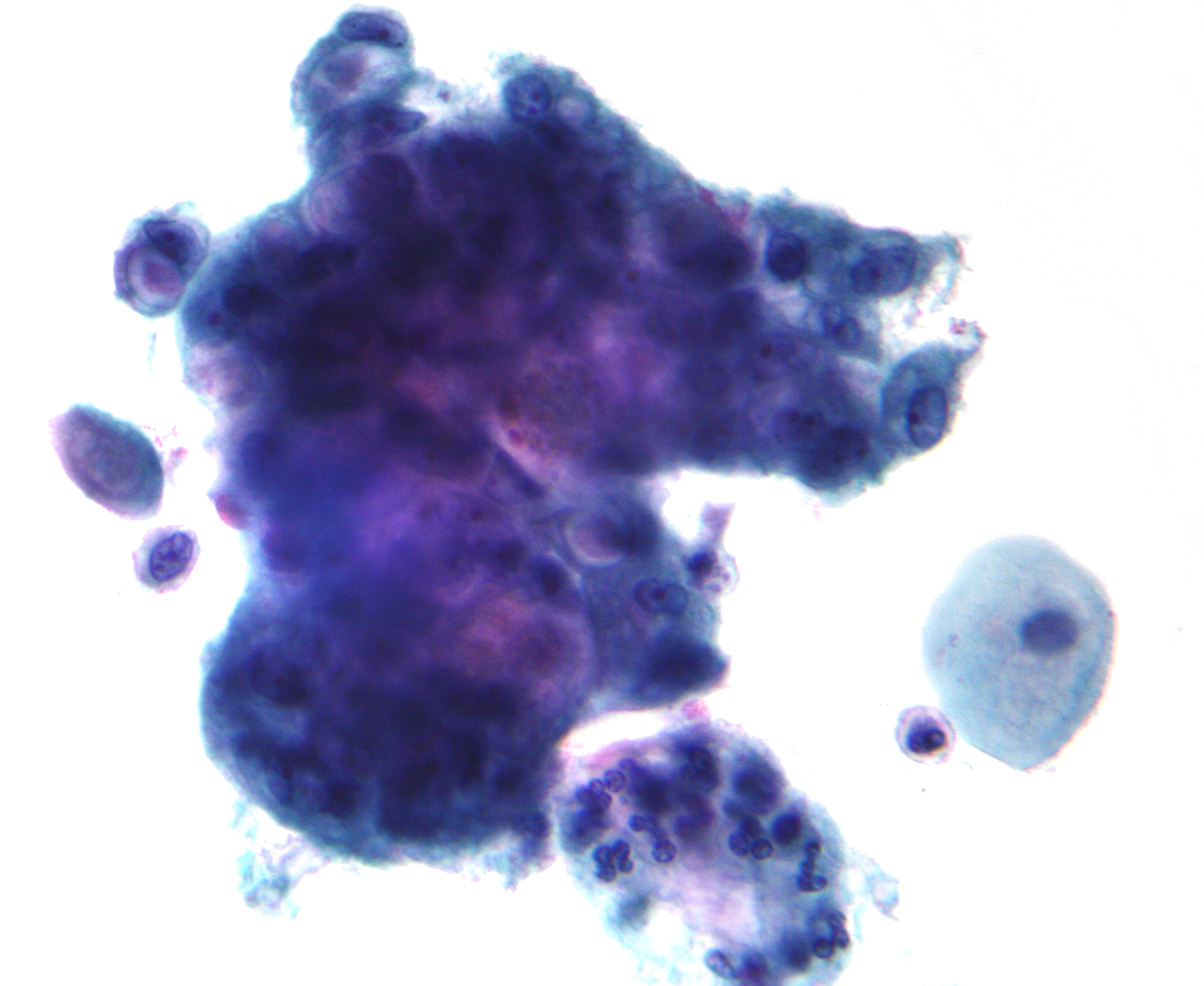
Micrograph of an adenocarcinoma that arose from the endocervical mucosa. Pap stain.

The endocervical mucosa is a site from which adenocarcinoma can arise. Endocervical adenocarcinoma, like cervical cancer (squamous cell carcinoma), often arises in the milieu of human papillomavirus infection.

As most endometrial cancers are adenocarcinomas, differentiation of endocervical adenocarcinoma and endometrial adenocarcinomas is required, as the treatment differs. Immunohistochemical staining is often helpful in this regard, endocervical adenocarcinomas are typically CEA and p16 positive and estrogen receptor, progesterone receptor and vimentin negative.

== See also ==
- Cervical pregnancy
