= Interstitial pregnancy =

- Other names: Cornual pregnancy
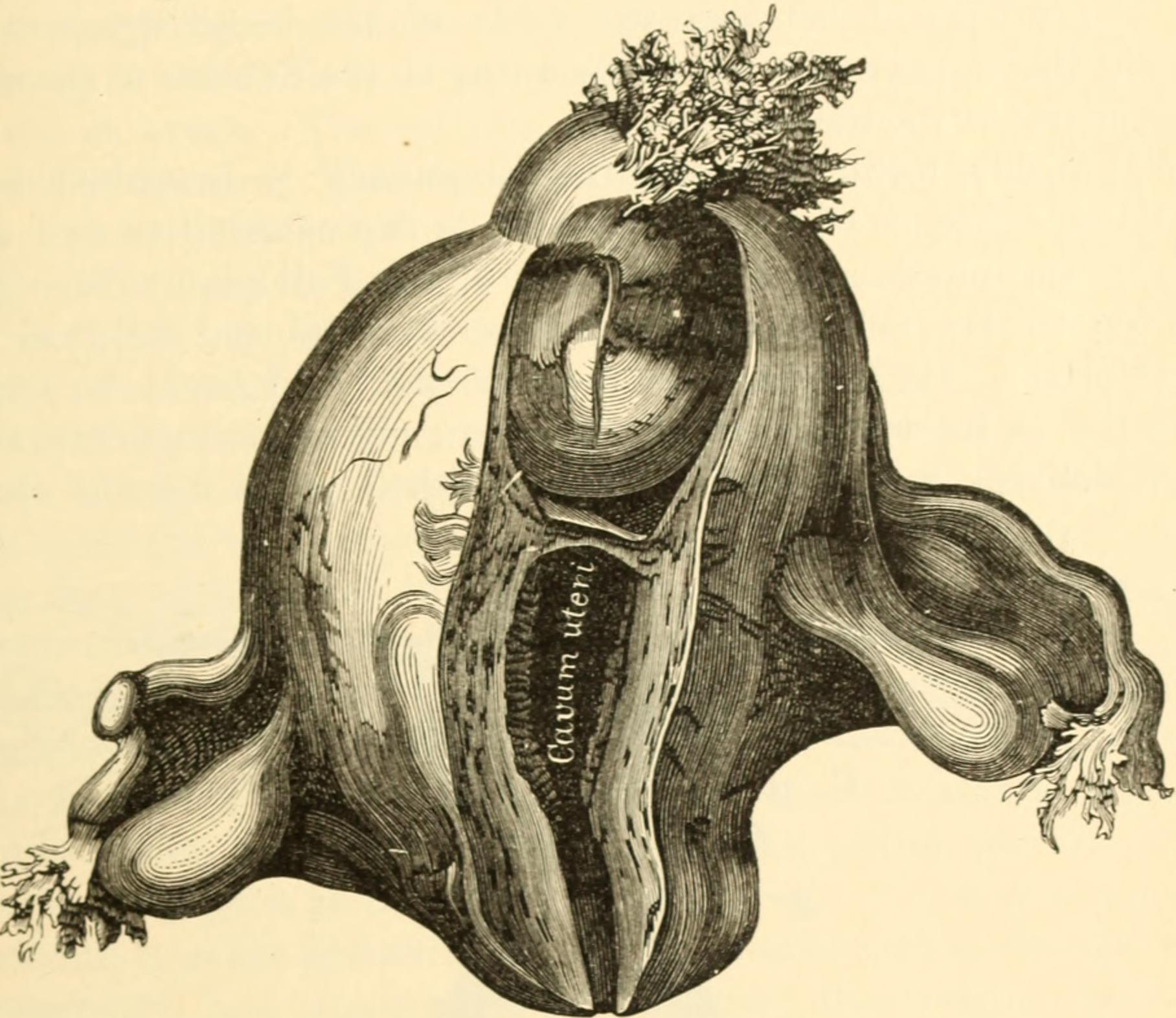
- Specialty: Obstetrics

An interstitial pregnancy is a uterine but ectopic pregnancy; the pregnancy is located outside the uterine cavity in that part of the fallopian tube that penetrates the muscular layer of the uterus. The term cornual pregnancy is sometimes used as a synonym, but remains ambiguous as it is also applied to indicate the presence of a pregnancy located within the cavity in one of the two upper "horns" of a bicornuate uterus. Interstitial pregnancies have a higher mortality than ectopics in general.

== Anatomy ==
The part of the Fallopian tube that is located in the uterine wall and connects the remainder of the tube to the endometrial cavity is called its "interstitial" part, hence the term "interstitial pregnancy"; it has a length of 1–2 cm and a width of 0.7 cm. Its borders are the opening (ostium) of the tube to the endometrial cavity within the uterus and, laterally, the visible narrow segment of the tube. The area is well supplied by the Sampson artery which is connected to both the uterine and the ovarian arteries. Surrounded by uterine muscle (myometrium) it can expand significantly when it hosts a pregnancy.

Interstitial pregnancies can be confused with angular pregnancies; the latter, however, are located within the endometrial cavity in the corner where the tube connects; typically those pregnancies are viable although a high rate of miscarriage has been reported. A pregnancy located next to the interstitial section laterally is an isthmic tubal pregnancy.

The definition of an ectopic pregnancy is a pregnancy outside the uterine cavity, not outside the uterus, as the interstitial pregnancy is still a uterine pregnancy.

== Diagnosis ==
Early diagnosis is important and today facilitated by the use of sonography and the quantitative human chorionic gonadotropin (hCG) assay. As in other cases of ectopic pregnancy, risk factors are: previous tubal pregnancy, IVF therapy, tubal surgery, and a history of sexual infection. Typical symptoms of an interstitial pregnancy are the classic signs of ectopic pregnancy, namely abdominal pain and vaginal bleeding. Hemorrhagic shock is found in almost a quarter of patients.; this explains the relatively high mortality rate.

In pregnant patients, sonography is the primary method to make the diagnosis, even when patients have no symptoms. The paucity of myometrium around the gestational sac is diagnostic, while, in contrast, the angular pregnancy has at least 5 mm of myometrium on all of its sides. Ultrasonic criteria for the diagnosis include an empty uterine cavity, a gestational sac separate from the uterine cavity, and a myometrial thinning of less than 5 mm around the gestational sac; typically the interstitial line sign—an echogenic line from the endometrial cavity to the corner next to the gestational mass—is seen. MRI can be used particularly when it is important to distinguish between an interstitial and angular pregnancy.

On average, the gestational age at presentation is about 7–8 weeks. In a 2007 series, 22% of patients presented with rupture and hemorrhagic shock, while a third of the patients were asymptomatic; the remainder had abdominal pain and/or vaginal bleeding. Cases that are not diagnosed until surgery show an asymmetrical bulge in the upper corner of the uterus.

== Treatment ==
Choice of treatment is largely dictated by the clinical situation. A ruptured interstitial pregnancy is a medical emergency that requires an immediate surgical intervention either by laparoscopy or laparotomy to stop the bleeding and remove the pregnancy.

Surgical methods to remove the pregnancy include cornual evacuation, incision of the cornua with removal of the pregnancy (cornuostomy), resection of the cornual area or a cornual wedge resection, typically combined with an ipsilateral salpingectomy, and hysterectomy. Because of the vascularity of the interstitial region particularly during pregnancy, blood loss during surgery may be substantial. Postoperatively, patients with conservative surgical therapy are at risk for development of a persistent ectopic pregnancy due to the presence of deeply embedded surviving trophoblastic tissue; thus, monitoring of hCG levels is indicated until they become undetectable.

In patients with an asymptomatic interstitial pregnancy methotrexate has been successfully used, however, this approach may fail and result in cornual rupture of the pregnancy. Selective uterine artery embolization has been successfully performed to treat interstitial pregnancies.

== Subsequent pregnancies ==
Patients with an ectopic pregnancy are generally at higher risk for a recurrence, however, there are no specific data for patients with an interstitial pregnancy. When a new pregnancy is diagnosed it is important to monitor the pregnancy by transvaginal sonography to assure that is it properly located, and that the surgically repaired area remains intact. Cesarean delivery is recommended to avoid uterine rupture during labor.

== Epidemiology ==
Interstitial pregnancies account for 2–4% of all tubal pregnancies, or for 1 in 2,500 to 5,000 live births. About one in fifty women with an interstitial pregnancy dies. Patients with an interstitial pregnancies have a seven-times higher mortality than those with ectopics in general. With the growing use of assisted reproductive technologies, the incidence of interstitial pregnancy is rising.
