= Ectopic pregnancy =

Attachment of an embryo outside the uterus

- Other names: EP, eccyesis, extrauterine pregnancy, EUP, tubal pregnancy (when in fallopian tube)
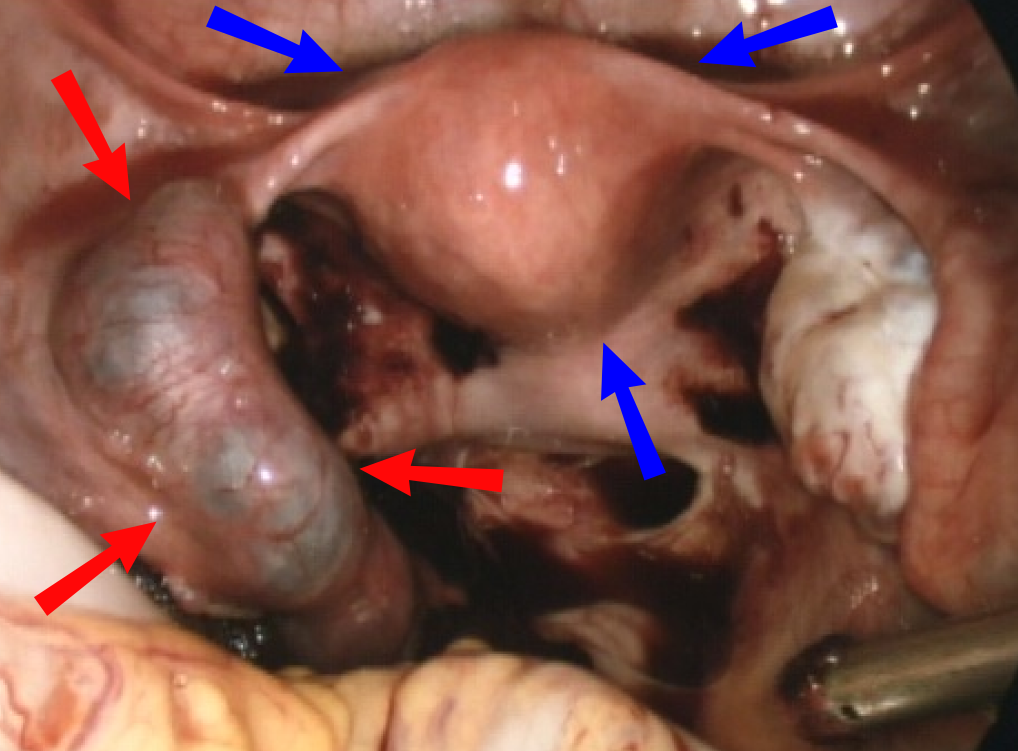
- Laparoscopic view, looking down at the uterus (marked by blue arrows). In the left fallopian tube, there is an ectopic pregnancy and bleeding (marked by red arrows). The right tube is normal.
- Specialty: Obstetrics and gynaecology, emergency medicine
- Symptoms: Abdominal pain, vaginal bleeding
- Risk factors: Pelvic inflammatory disease, tobacco smoking, prior tubal surgery, history of infertility, use of assisted reproductive technology
- Diagnostic method: Blood tests for human chorionic gonadotropin (hCG), ultrasound
- Differential diagnosis: Miscarriage, ovarian torsion, acute appendicitis, corpus luteum cyst rupture
- Treatment: methotrexate, surgery
- Prognosis: Mortality 0.2% (developed world), 2% (developing world)
- Frequency: ~1.5% of pregnancies (developed world)

Ectopic pregnancy is a complication of pregnancy in which the embryo attaches outside the uterus. This complication has also been referred to as an extrauterine pregnancy (a.k.a. EUP). Signs and symptoms classically include abdominal pain and vaginal bleeding, but fewer than 50 percent of affected women have both of these symptoms. The pain may be described as sharp, dull, or crampy. Pain may also spread to the shoulder if bleeding into the abdomen has occurred. Severe bleeding may result in a fast heart rate, fainting, or shock. With very rare exceptions, the fetus is unable to survive, and the risk of maternal death is high.

Overall, ectopic pregnancies annually affect less than 2% of pregnancies worldwide. Risk factors for ectopic pregnancy include pelvic inflammatory disease, often due to chlamydia infection; tobacco smoking; endometriosis; prior tubal surgery; a history of infertility; and the use of assisted reproductive technology. Those who have previously had an ectopic pregnancy are at much higher risk of having another one. Most ectopic pregnancies (90%) occur in the fallopian tube, which are known as tubal pregnancies, but implantation can also occur on the cervix, ovaries, caesarean scar, or within the abdomen. Detection of ectopic pregnancy is typically by blood tests for human chorionic gonadotropin (hCG) and ultrasound. This may require testing on more than one occasion. Other causes of similar symptoms include: miscarriage, ovarian torsion, and acute appendicitis.

Prevention is by decreasing risk factors, such as chlamydia infections, through screening and treatment. While some ectopic pregnancies will miscarry without treatment, the standard treatment for ectopic pregnancy is a procedure to either remove the embryo from the fallopian tube or to remove the fallopian tube altogether. The use of the medication methotrexate works as well as surgery in some cases. Specifically, it works well when the beta-HCG is low, and the size of the ectopic is small. Surgery such as a salpingectomy is still typically recommended if the tube has ruptured, there is a fetal heartbeat, or the woman's vital signs are unstable. The surgery may be laparoscopic or through a larger incision, known as a laparotomy. Maternal morbidity and mortality are reduced with treatment.

The rate of ectopic pregnancy is about 11 to 20 per 1,000 live births in developed countries, though it may be as high as 4% among those using assisted reproductive technology. It is the most common cause of death among women during the first trimester at approximately 6–13% of the total. In the developed world outcomes have improved while in the developing world they often remain poor. The risk of death among those in the developed world is between 0.1 and 0.3 percent while in the developing world it is between one and three percent. The first known description of an ectopic pregnancy is by Al-Zahrawi in the 11th century. The word ectopic means 'out of place'.

== Signs and symptoms ==
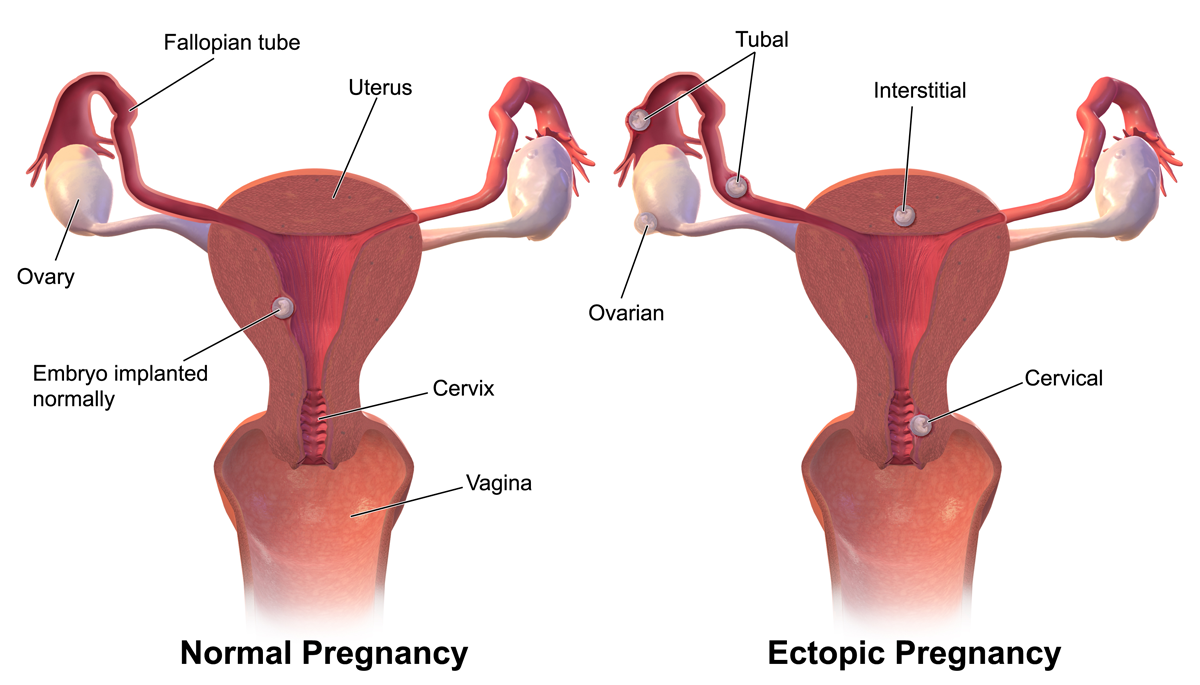
Ectopic pregnancy

Up to 10% of those with ectopic pregnancy have no symptoms, and one-third have no medical signs. In many cases the symptoms have low specificity, and can be similar to those of other genitourinary and gastrointestinal disorders, such as appendicitis, salpingitis, rupture of a corpus luteum cyst, miscarriage, ovarian torsion or urinary tract infection. Clinical presentation of ectopic pregnancy occurs at a mean of 7.2 weeks after the last normal menstrual period, with a range of four to eight weeks. Later presentations are more common in communities deprived of modern diagnostic abilities.

Signs and symptoms of ectopic pregnancy include increased hCG, vaginal bleeding (in varying amounts), sudden lower abdominal pain, pelvic pain, a tender cervix, an adnexal mass, or adnexal tenderness. In the absence of ultrasound or hCG assessment, heavy vaginal bleeding may lead to a misdiagnosis of miscarriage. Nausea, vomiting and diarrhea are more rare symptoms of ectopic pregnancy.

Rupture of an ectopic pregnancy can lead to symptoms such as abdominal distension, tenderness, peritonism, and hypovolemic shock. Someone with a ruptured ectopic pregnancy may experience pain when lying flat and may prefer to maintain an upright posture, as intrapelvic blood flow can lead to swelling of the abdominal cavity and cause additional pain.

=== Complications ===
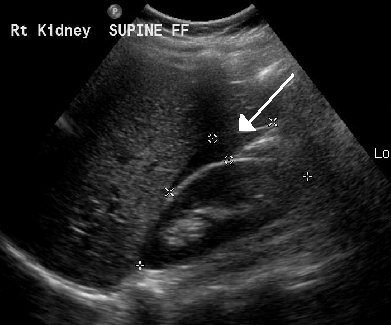
Blood in Morison's pouch between the liver and kidney due to a ruptured ectopic pregnancy

The most common complication is rupture with internal bleeding, which may lead to hypovolemic shock. Damage to the fallopian tubes can lead to difficulty becoming pregnant in the future. The woman's other fallopian tube may function sufficiently for pregnancy. After the removal of one damaged fallopian tube, pregnancy remains possible in the future. If both are removed, in-vitro fertilization remains an option for women hoping to become pregnant.

== Causes ==
There are several risk factors for ectopic pregnancies. However, in as many as one-third to one-half no risk factors can be identified. Risk factors include: pelvic inflammatory disease, infertility, use of an intrauterine device (IUD), previous exposure to diethylstilbestrol (DES), tubal surgery, intrauterine surgery (e.g. D&C), smoking, previous ectopic pregnancy, endometriosis, and tubal ligation. A previous induced abortion does not appear to increase the risk. The IUD does not increase the risk of ectopic pregnancy, but with an IUD if pregnancy occurs it is more likely to be ectopic than intrauterine. The risk of ectopic pregnancy after chlamydia infection is low. The exact mechanism through which chlamydia increases the risk of ectopic pregnancy is uncertain, though some research suggests that the infection can affect the structure of fallopian tubes.

Risk factors
Relative risk factors
High	Tubal sterilization, IUD, prior ectopic, PID (pelvic inflammatory disease), endometriosis, SIN (salpingitis isthmica nodosa)
Moderate	Smoking, having more than 1 recent sexual (male) partner, infertility, and chlamydia
Low	Douching, age greater than 35, age less than 25, GIFT (gamete intrafallopian transfer)

=== Tube damage ===
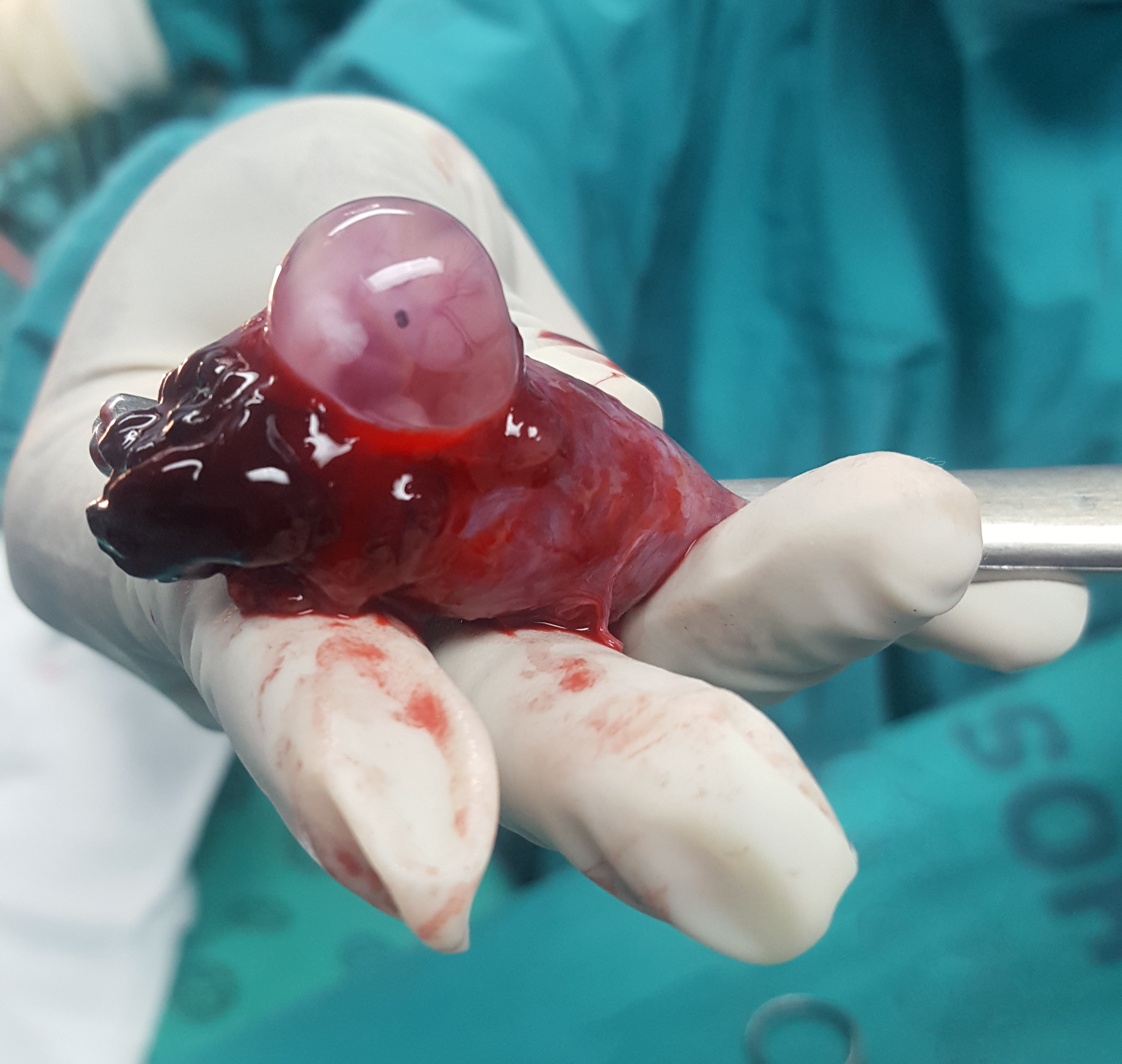
Left fallopian tube with an ectopic pregnancy in a 25-year-old woman after a salpingectomy

Tubal pregnancy is when the egg is implanted in the fallopian tubes. Hair-like cilia located on the internal surface of the fallopian tubes carry the fertilized egg to the uterus. Fallopian cilia are sometimes seen in reduced numbers after an ectopic pregnancy, leading to a hypothesis that cilia damage in the fallopian tubes is likely to lead to an ectopic pregnancy. Women who smoke have a higher chance of an ectopic pregnancy in the fallopian tubes. Smoking leads to risk factors of damaging and destroying cilia. As cilia degenerate, the amount of time it takes for the fertilized egg to reach the uterus will increase. The fertilized egg, if it does not reach the uterus in time, will hatch from the non-adhesive zona pellucida and implant itself inside the fallopian tube, thus causing ectopic pregnancy.

Women with pelvic inflammatory disease (PID) have a high occurrence of ectopic pregnancy. This results from the build-up of scar tissue in the fallopian tubes, causing damage to the cilia. However, if both tubes were completely blocked, so that sperm and egg were physically unable to meet, then fertilization of the egg would naturally be impossible, and neither normal pregnancy nor ectopic pregnancy could occur. Intrauterine adhesions (IUA) present in Asherman's syndrome can cause ectopic cervical pregnancy or, if adhesions partially block access to the tubes via the ostia, ectopic tubal pregnancy. Asherman's syndrome usually occurs from intrauterine surgery, most commonly after D&C. Endometrial/pelvic/genital tuberculosis, another cause of Asherman's syndrome, can also lead to ectopic pregnancy as infection may lead to tubal adhesions in addition to intrauterine adhesions.

Tubal ligation can predispose to ectopic pregnancy. Reversal of tubal sterilization (tubal reversal) carries a risk for ectopic pregnancy. This is higher if more destructive methods of tubal ligation (tubal cautery, partial removal of the tubes) have been used than less destructive methods (tubal clipping). A history of a tubal pregnancy increases the risk of future occurrences to about 10%. This risk is not reduced by removing the affected tube, even if the other tube appears normal. The best method for diagnosing this is to perform an early ultrasound.

=== Endometriosis ===
Endometriosis is a disease in which cells similar to those of the endometrium, the tissue covering the inside of the uterus, grow outside the uterus. An embryo attaching to such lesions leads to an ectopic pregnancy. The results of a 30-year study of reproductive and pregnancy outcomes, involving 14,000+ women of childbearing age, were presented at the 2015 European Society of Human Reproduction and Embryology (ESHRE) annual congress. 39% of the study group had surgically confirmed endometriosis. Compared to their peers, the endometriosis subgroup had a 76% higher risk for miscarriage and a 270% higher risk for ectopic pregnancy. The higher risk of endometriosis was attributed to increased pelvic inflammation and structural and functional changes in the uterine lining.

=== Other ===
Although some investigations have shown that patients may be at higher risk for ectopic pregnancy with advancing age, it is believed that age is a variable that could act as a surrogate for other risk factors. Vaginal douching is thought by some to increase ectopic pregnancies. Women exposed to DES in utero (also known as "DES daughters") also have an elevated risk of ectopic pregnancy. However, DES has not been used since 1971 in the United States. It has also been suggested that pathologic generation of nitric oxide through increased iNOS production may decrease tubal ciliary beats and smooth muscle contractions and thus affect embryo transport, which may consequently result in ectopic pregnancy. Low socioeconomic status may also be a risk factor for ectopic pregnancy.

== Diagnosis ==
An ectopic pregnancy should be considered as the cause of abdominal pain or vaginal bleeding in everyone who has a positive pregnancy test. The primary goal of diagnostic procedures in possible ectopic pregnancy is to triage according to risk rather than establishing pregnancy location.

=== Transvaginal ultrasonography ===
An ultrasound showing a gestational sac with the fetal heart in the fallopian tube has a very high specificity for ectopic pregnancy. It involves a long, thin transducer, covered with the conducting gel and a plastic/latex sheath, and inserted into the vagina. Transvaginal ultrasonography has a sensitivity of at least 90% for ectopic pregnancy. The diagnostic ultrasonographic finding in ectopic pregnancy is an adnexal mass that moves separately from the ovary. In around 60% of cases, it is an inhomogeneous or a noncystic adnexal mass, sometimes known as the "blob sign". It is generally spherical, but a more tubular appearance may be seen in the case of hematosalpinx. This sign has been estimated to have a sensitivity of 84% and a specificity of 99% in diagnosing ectopic pregnancy. In the study estimating these values, the blob sign had a positive predictive value of 96% and a negative predictive value of 95%. The visualization of an empty extrauterine gestational sac is sometimes known as the "bagel sign", and is present in around 20% of cases. In another 20% of cases, there is visualization of a gestational sac containing a yolk sac or an embryo. Ectopic pregnancies where there is visualization of cardiac activity are sometimes termed "viable ectopic".

Transvaginal ultrasonography of an ectopic pregnancy, showing the field of view in the following image

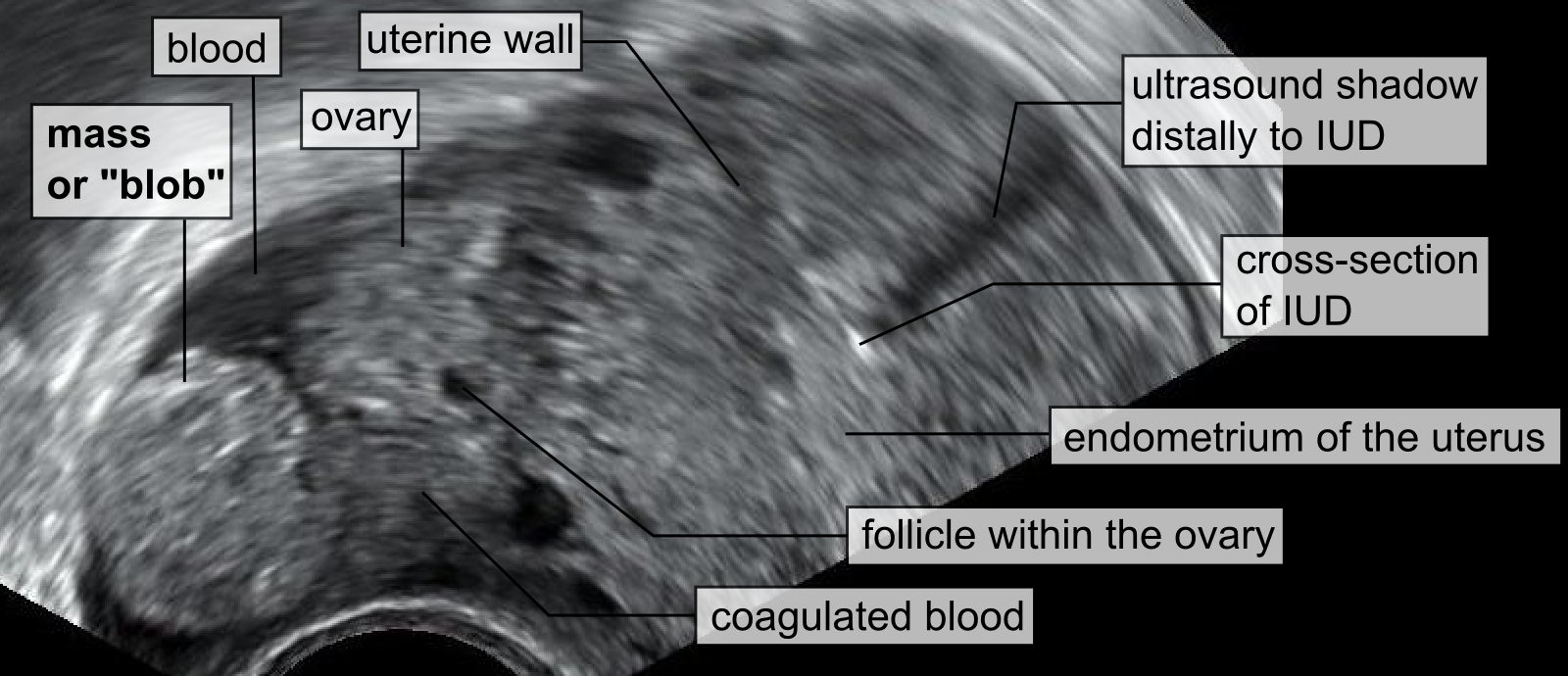
A "blob sign", which consists of the ectopic pregnancy. The ovary is distinguished from it by having follicles, whereof one is visible in the field. This patient had an intrauterine device (IUD) with progestogen, whose cross-section is visible in the field, leaving an ultrasound shadow distally to it.

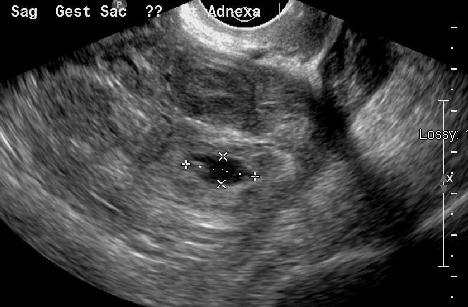
Ultrasound image showing an ectopic pregnancy where a gestational sac and fetus have been formed

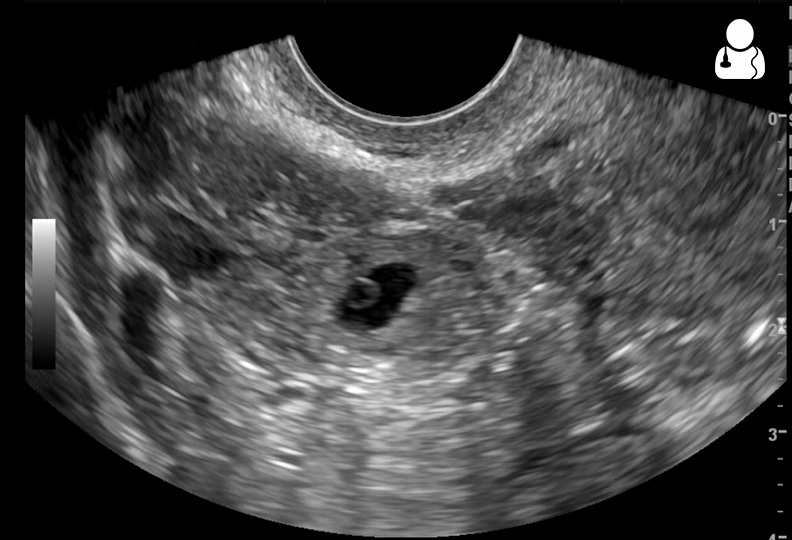
A pregnancy not in the uterus

The combination of a positive pregnancy test and the presence of what appears to be a normal intrauterine pregnancy does not exclude ectopic pregnancy, since there may be either a heterotopic pregnancy or a "pseudosac", which is a collection of within the endometrial cavity that may be seen in up to 20% of women.

A small amount of anechogenic-free fluid in the recto-uterine pouch is commonly found in both intrauterine and ectopic pregnancies. The presence of echogenic fluid is estimated at between 28 and 56% of women with an ectopic pregnancy, and strongly indicates the presence of hemoperitoneum. However, it does not necessarily result from tubal rupture but is commonly a result from leakage from the distal tubal opening. As a rule of thumb, the finding of free fluid is significant if it reaches the fundus or is present in the vesico-uterine pouch. A further marker of serious intra-abdominal bleeding is the presence of fluid in the hepatorenal recess of the subhepatic space.

As of 2014, Doppler ultrasonography is not considered to significantly contribute to the diagnosis of ectopic pregnancy.

A common misdiagnosis of a normal intrauterine pregnancy is when the pregnancy is implanted laterally in an arcuate uterus, potentially being misdiagnosed as an interstitial pregnancy.

=== Ultrasonography and β-hCG ===
Algorithm of the management of a pregnancy of unknown location, that is, a positive pregnancy test but no pregnancy is found on transvaginal ultrasonography. If serum hCG at 0 hours is more than 1000 IU/L and there is no history suggestive of complete miscarriage, the ultrasonography should be repeated as soon as possible.

Where no intrauterine pregnancy (IUP) is seen on ultrasound, measuring β-human chorionic gonadotropin (β-hCG) levels may aid in the diagnosis. The rationale is that a low β-hCG level may indicate that the pregnancy is intrauterine but too small to be visible on ultrasonography. While some physicians consider that the threshold where an intrauterine pregnancy should be visible on transvaginal ultrasound is around 1500 mIU/mL of β-hCG, a review in the JAMA Rational Clinical Examination Series showed that there is no single threshold for the β-human chorionic gonadotropin that confirms an ectopic pregnancy. Instead, the best test for a pregnant woman is a high-resolution transvaginal ultrasound. The presence of an adnexal mass in the absence of an intrauterine pregnancy on transvaginal sonography increases the likelihood of an ectopic pregnancy 100-fold (LR+ 111). When there are no adnexal abnormalities on transvaginal sonography, the likelihood of an ectopic pregnancy decreases (LR- 0.12). An empty uterus with levels higher than 1500 mIU/mL may be evidence of an ectopic pregnancy, but it may also be consistent with an intrauterine pregnancy, which is too small to be seen on ultrasound. If the diagnosis is uncertain, it may be necessary to wait a few days and repeat the blood work. This can be done by measuring the β-hCG level approximately 48 hours later and repeating the ultrasound. The serum hCG ratios and logistic regression models appear to be better than absolute single serum hCG level. If the β-hCG falls on repeat examination, this strongly suggests a spontaneous abortion or rupture. The fall in serum hCG over 48 hours may be measured as the hCG ratio, which is calculated as: $hCG~ratio = \frac{hCG~at~48h}{hCG~at~0h}$

An hCG ratio of 0.87 – a decrease in hCG of 13% over 48 hours – has a sensitivity of 93% and specificity of 97% for predicting a failing pregnancy of unknown location (PUL). The majority of cases of ectopic pregnancy will have serial serum hCG levels that increase more slowly than would be expected with an IUP (known as a suboptimal rise), or decrease more slowly than would be expected with a failing PUL. However, up to 20% of cases of ectopic pregnancy have serum hCG doubling times similar to that of an IUP, and around 10% of EP cases have hCG patterns similar to a failing PUL.

=== Other methods ===
==== Direct examination ====
A laparoscopy or laparotomy can also be performed to confirm an ectopic pregnancy visually. This is generally reserved for women presenting with signs of an acute abdomen and hypovolemic shock. Often, if a tubal abortion or tubal rupture has occurred, it is difficult to find the pregnancy tissue. A laparoscopy in a very early ectopic pregnancy rarely shows a normal-looking fallopian tube.

==== Culdocentesis ====
Culdocentesis, in which fluid is retrieved from the space separating the vagina and rectum, is a less commonly performed test that may be used to look for internal bleeding. In this test, a needle is inserted into the space at the very top of the vagina, behind the uterus, and in front of the rectum. Any blood or fluid found may have been derived from a ruptured ectopic pregnancy.

==== Progesterone levels ====
Progesterone levels of less than 20 nmol/L have a high predictive value for failing pregnancies, whilst levels over 25 nmol/L are likely to predict viable pregnancies, and levels over 60 nmol/L are strongly so. This may help identify failing PUL that are at low risk and thereby require less follow-up. Inhibin A may also be useful for predicting spontaneous resolution of PUL, but is not as effective as progesterone for this purpose.

==== Mathematical models ====
There are various mathematical models, such as logistic regression models and Bayesian networks, for the prediction of PUL outcomes based on multiple parameters. Mathematical models also aim to identify PULs that are low risk, that is, failing PULs and IUPs.

==== Dilation and curettage ====
Dilation and curettage (D&C) is sometimes used to diagnose pregnancy location to differentiate between an EP and a non-viable IUP in situations where a viable IUP can be ruled out. Specific indications for this procedure include either of the following:

- No visible IUP on transvaginal ultrasonography with a serum hCG of more than 2000 mIU/mL.
- An abnormal rise in hCG level. A rise of 35% over 48 hours is proposed as the minimal rise consistent with a viable intrauterine pregnancy.
- An abnormal fall in hCG level, defined as one of less than 20% in two days.

=== Classification ===
==== Tubal pregnancy ====
The vast majority of ectopic pregnancies implant in the fallopian tube. Pregnancies can grow in the fimbrial end (5% of all ectopic pregnancies), the ampullary section (80%), the isthmus (12%), and the cornual and interstitial part of the tube (2%). Mortality of a tubal pregnancy at the isthmus or within the uterus (interstitial pregnancy) is higher as there is increased vascularity that may result more likely in sudden major internal bleeding. A review published in 2010 supports the hypothesis that tubal ectopic pregnancy is caused by a combination of retention of the embryo within the fallopian tube due to impaired embryo-tubal transport and alterations in the tubal environment allowing early implantation to occur.

==== Nontubal ectopic pregnancy ====
Two percent of ectopic pregnancies occur in the ovary, cervix, or are intra-abdominal. Transvaginal ultrasound examination is usually able to detect a cervical pregnancy. An ovarian pregnancy is differentiated from a tubal pregnancy by the Spiegelberg criteria.

While a fetus of ectopic pregnancy is typically not viable, very rarely, live babies have been delivered from abdominal pregnancy or C-section scar ectopic pregnancy. In the former situation, the placenta sits on the intra-abdominal organs or the peritoneum and has found sufficient blood supply. This is generally bowel or mesentery, but other sites, such as the renal (kidney), liver or hepatic (liver) artery, or even the aorta, have been described. Support to near viability has occasionally been described, but even in Third World countries, the diagnosis is most commonly made at 16 to 20 weeks' gestation. Such a fetus would have to be delivered by laparotomy. Maternal morbidity and mortality from extrauterine pregnancy are high, as attempts to remove the placenta from the organs to which it is attached usually lead to uncontrollable bleeding from the attachment site. If the organ to which the placenta is attached is removable, such as a section of the bowel, then the placenta should be removed together with that organ. This is such a rare occurrence that true data is unavailable, and reliance must be made on anecdotal reports. However, the vast majority of abdominal pregnancies require intervention well before fetal viability because of the risk of bleeding.

With the increase in Cesarean sections performed worldwide, Cesarean section ectopic pregnancies (CSP) are rare, but becoming more common. The incidence of CSP is not well known; however, there have been estimates based on different populations of 1:1800–1:2216. CSP are characterized by abnormal implantation into the scar from a previous cesarean section, and allowed to continue can cause serious complications such as uterine rupture and hemorrhage. Patients with CSP generally present without symptoms; symptoms can include vaginal bleeding that may or may not be associated with pain. The diagnosis of CSP is made by ultrasound and four characteristics are noted: (1) Empty uterine cavity with bright hyperechoic endometrial stripe (2) Empty cervical canal (3) Intrauterine mass in the anterior part of the uterine isthmus, and (4) Absence of the anterior uterine muscle layer, and/or absence or thinning between the bladder and gestational sac, measuring less than 5 mm. Given the rarity of the diagnosis, treatment options tend to be described in case reports and series, ranging from medical with methotrexate or KCl to surgical with dilation and curettage, uterine wedge resection, or hysterectomy. A double-balloon catheter technique has also been described, allowing for uterine preservation. The recurrence risk for CSP is unknown, and early ultrasound in the next pregnancy is recommended.

==== Heterotopic pregnancy ====
In rare cases of ectopic pregnancy, there may be two fertilized eggs, one outside the uterus and the other inside. This is called a heterotopic pregnancy. Often, the intrauterine pregnancy is discovered later than the ectopic, mainly because of the painful emergency nature of ectopic pregnancies. Since ectopic pregnancies are normally discovered and removed very early in the pregnancy, an ultrasound may not find the additional pregnancy inside the uterus. When hCG levels continue to rise after the removal of the ectopic pregnancy, there is a chance that a pregnancy inside the uterus is still viable. This is normally discovered through an ultrasound.

Although rare, heterotopic pregnancies are becoming more common, likely due to increased use of IVF. The survival rate of the uterine fetus of a heterotopic pregnancy is around 70%.

==== Rudimentary horn pregnancy ====
A pregnancy in a rudimentary horn refers to a rare and life-threatening condition that occurs when a fertilized egg implants inside the small rudimentary horn of a unicornuate uterus, which is a type of congenital uterine abnormality caused by the incomplete development of one of the Müllerian ducts. This type of ectopic pregnancy is often results in rupture of the rudimentary horn between 10 and 15 weeks of gestation, leading to a high risk of morbidity and mortality.

==== Persistent ectopic pregnancy ====
A persistent ectopic pregnancy refers to the continuation of trophoblastic growth after a surgical intervention to remove an ectopic pregnancy. After a conservative procedure that attempts to preserve the affected fallopian tube, such as a salpingotomy, in about 15–20%, the major portion of the ectopic growth may have been removed, but some trophoblastic tissue, perhaps deeply embedded, has escaped removal and continues to grow, generating a new rise in hCG levels. After weeks, this may lead to new clinical symptoms, including bleeding. For this reason, hCG levels may have to be monitored after the removal of an ectopic pregnancy to ensure their decline, also methotrexate can be given at the time of surgery prophylactically.

==== Pregnancy of unknown location ====
Pregnancy of unknown location (PUL) is the term used for a pregnancy where there is a positive pregnancy test but no pregnancy has been visualized using transvaginal ultrasonography. Specialized early pregnancy departments have estimated that between 8% and 10% of women attending for an ultrasound assessment in early pregnancy will be classified as having a PUL. The true nature of the pregnancy can be an ongoing viable intrauterine pregnancy, a failed pregnancy, an ectopic pregnancy or rarely a persisting PUL.

Because of frequent ambiguity on ultrasonography examinations, the following classification is proposed:

Condition	Criteria
Definite ectopic pregnancy	Extrauterine gestational sac with yolk sac or embryo (with or without cardiac activity).
Pregnancy of unknown location – probable ectopic pregnancy	Inhomogeneous adnexal mass or extrauterine sac-like structure.
"True" pregnancy of unknown location	No signs of intrauterine or extrauterine pregnancy on transvaginal ultrasonography.
Pregnancy of unknown location – probable intrauterine pregnancy	Intrauterine gestational sac-like structure.
Definite intrauterine pregnancy	Intrauterine gestational sac with yolk sac or embryo (with or without cardiac activity).

In women with a pregnancy of unknown location, between 6% and 20% have an ectopic pregnancy. In cases of pregnancy of unknown location and a history of heavy bleeding, it has been estimated that approximately 6% have an underlying ectopic pregnancy. Between 30% and 47% of women with pregnancy of unknown location are ultimately diagnosed with an ongoing intrauterine pregnancy, of which the majority (50–70%) will be found to have failed pregnancies where the location is never confirmed.

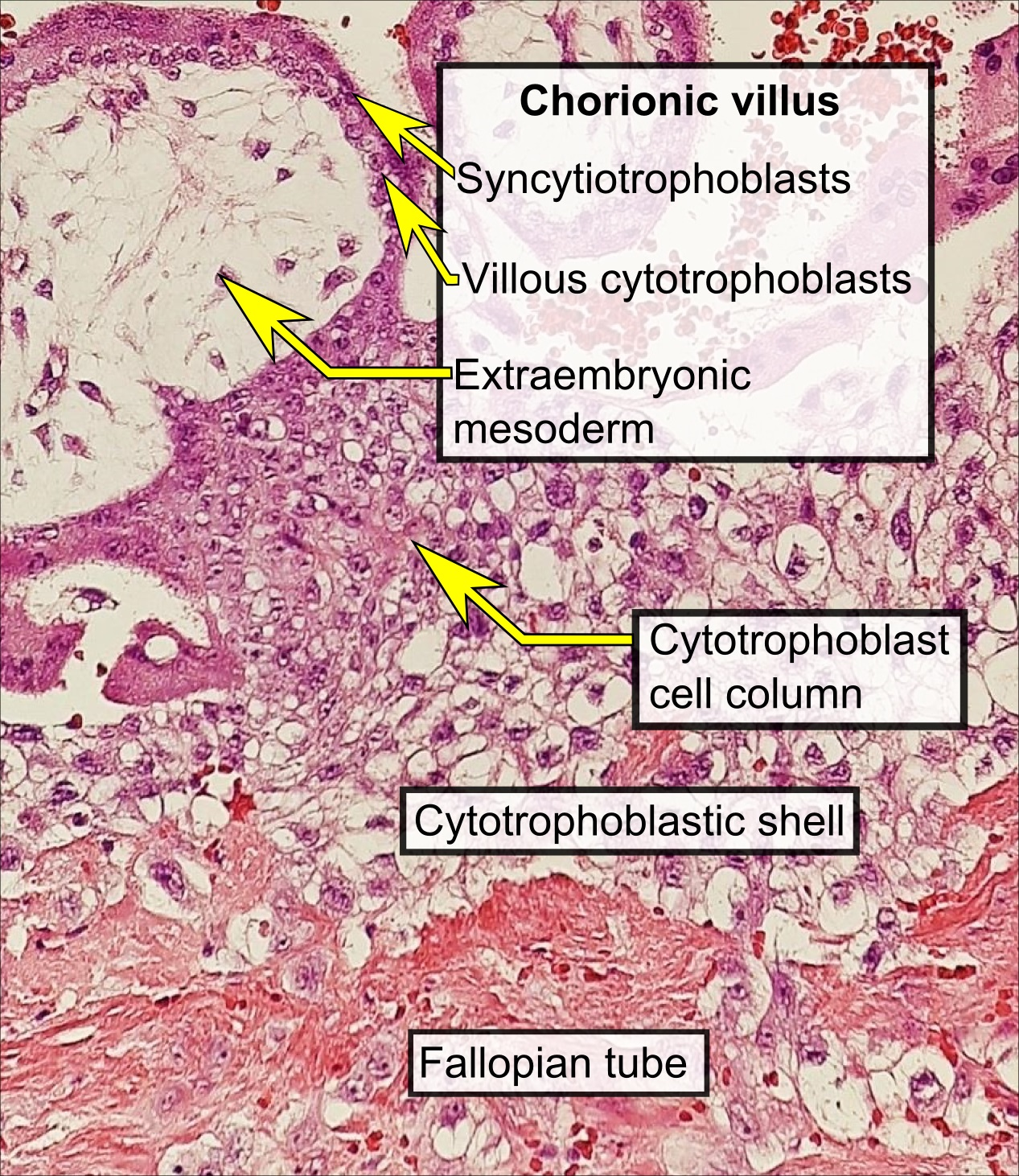
Chorionic villus on histopathological examination of a tubal pregnancy

Persisting PUL is where the hCG level does not spontaneously decline, and no intrauterine or ectopic pregnancy is identified on follow-up transvaginal ultrasonography. A persisting PUL is likely either a small ectopic pregnancy that has not been visualized or a retained trophoblast in the endometrial cavity. Treatment should only be considered when a potentially viable intrauterine pregnancy has been definitively excluded. A treated persistent PUL is defined as one managed medically (generally with methotrexate) without confirmation of the location of the pregnancy, such as by ultrasound, laparoscopy, or uterine evacuation. A resolved persistent PUL is defined as serum hCG reaching a non-pregnant value (generally less than 5 IU/L) after expectant management, or after uterine evacuation without evidence of chorionic villi on histopathological examination. In contrast, a relatively low and unresolving level of serum hCG indicates the possibility of an hCG-secreting tumor.

=== Differential diagnosis ===
Other conditions that cause similar symptoms include: miscarriage, ovarian torsion, acute appendicitis, ruptured ovarian cyst, kidney stone, and pelvic inflammatory disease, among others.

== Treatment ==
=== Expectant management ===
Most women with a PUL are followed up with serum hCG measurements and repeat TVS examinations until a final diagnosis is confirmed. Low-risk cases of PUL that appear to be failing pregnancies may be followed up with a urinary pregnancy test after two weeks and get subsequent telephone advice. Low-risk cases of PUL that are likely intrauterine pregnancies may have another TVS in two weeks to assess viability. High-risk cases of PUL require further assessment, either with a TVS within 48 h or additional hCG measurement.

=== Medical ===
Early treatment of ectopic pregnancy with methotrexate is a viable alternative to surgical treatment which was developed in the 1980s. If administered early in the pregnancy, methotrexate terminates the growth of the developing embryo; the developing embryo may then be either resorbed by the woman's body or pass with a menstrual period. Contraindications include ectopic embryonic mass > 3.5 cm and evidence of ruptured fallopian tube, as well as renal or hepatic dysfunction.

Also, it may lead to the inadvertent termination of an undetected intrauterine pregnancy or severe abnormality in any surviving pregnancy. Therefore, it is recommended that methotrexate should only be administered when hCG has been serially monitored with a rise of less than 35% over 48 hours, which practically excludes a viable intrauterine pregnancy.

For nontubal ectopic pregnancy, evidence from randomized clinical trials in women with CSP is uncertain regarding treatment success, complications and side effects of methotrexate compared with surgery (uterine arterial embolization or uterine arterial chemoembolization).

The United States uses a multi-dose protocol of methotrexate (MTX), which involves four doses of intramuscular MTX along with an intramuscular injection of folinic acid to protect cells from the effects of the drug and to reduce side effects. In France, the single-dose protocol is followed, but a single dose has a greater chance of failure.

=== Surgery ===
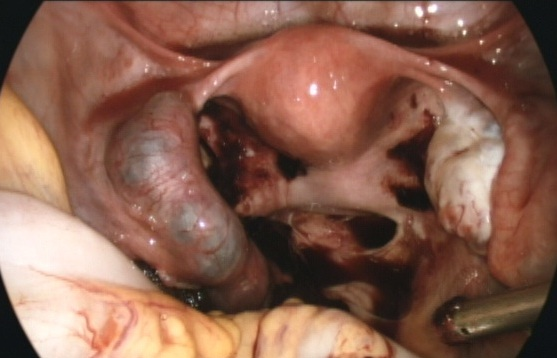
Surgical treatment: Laparoscopic view of an ectopic pregnancy located in the left fallopian tube, hematosalpinx is present on the left, the right tube is of normal appearance

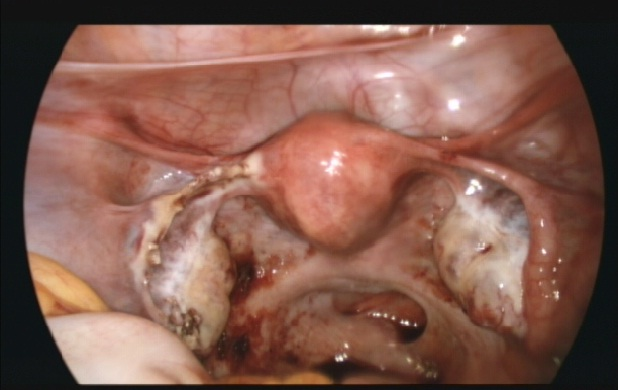
The left fallopian tube containing the ectopic pregnancy has been removed (salpingectomy).

If bleeding has already occurred, surgical intervention may be necessary. However, whether to pursue surgical intervention is an often difficult decision in a stable patient with minimal evidence of a blood clot on ultrasound.

Surgeons use laparoscopy or laparotomy to gain access to the pelvis and can either incise the affected fallopian tube and remove only the pregnancy (salpingostomy) or remove the affected tube with the pregnancy (salpingectomy). The first successful surgery for an ectopic pregnancy was performed by Robert Lawson Tait in 1883. It is estimated that an acceptable rate of PULs that eventually undergo surgery is between 0.5 and 11%. Women who undergo salpingectomy and salpingostomy have a similar recurrent ectopic pregnancy rate of 5% and 8%, respectively. Additionally, their intrauterine pregnancy rates are also similar, 56% and 61%.

Autotransfusion of a woman's own blood as drained during surgery may be useful in those who have a lot of bleeding into their abdomen.

No technique exists to re-implant an ectopic embryo in the uterus – all interventions, whether surgical or pharmaceutical, result in the termination of the ectopic pregnancy. Published reports that a reimplanted embryo survived to birth were debunked as false.

== Prognosis ==
When ectopic pregnancies are treated, the prognosis for the mother is very good in Western countries; maternal death is rare, although treatment nearly always requires the removal of the nonviable fetus. For instance, in the UK, between 2003 and 2005, there were 32,100 ectopic pregnancies resulting in 10 maternal deaths (meaning that 1 in 3,210 women with an ectopic pregnancy died, or around 0.03% case fatality rate). In 2006–2008 the UK Confidential Enquiry into Maternal Deaths found that ectopic pregnancy was the cause of 6 maternal deaths out of 2.3 million pregnancies in that period (0.26/100,000 pregnancies).

In the developing world, however, the death rate is substantially higher at around 1–3% case fatality rate. The burden of ectopic pregnancy is much higher in developing countries, causing the deaths of 3478 (95% confidence interval: 2849 to 4187) people in low income countries in 2019, or 0.68 (95% CI: 0.56 to 0.82) per 100,000 population, and was responsible for the loss of 37.69 (95% CI: 30.83 to 45.33) disability adjusted life years per 100,000, indicating that it is a significant cause of death and disease burden among women of child-bearing age in these countries.

In women who have had an ectopic pregnancy, the risk of another one in the next pregnancy is around 10%.

=== Future fertility ===
Fertility following ectopic pregnancy depends upon several factors, the most important of which is a prior history of infertility. The treatment choice does not play a major role; a randomized study in 2013 concluded that the rates of intrauterine pregnancy two years after treatment of ectopic pregnancy are approximately 64% with radical surgery, 67% with medication, and 70% with conservative surgery. In comparison, the cumulative pregnancy rate of women under 40 years of age in the general population over two years is over 90%.

Methotrexate does not affect future fertility treatments. The number of oocytes that were retrieved before and after treatment with methotrexate does not change.

In case of ovarian ectopic pregnancy, the risk of subsequent ectopic pregnancy or infertility is low.

There is no evidence that massage improves fertility after an ectopic pregnancy.

== Epidemiology ==
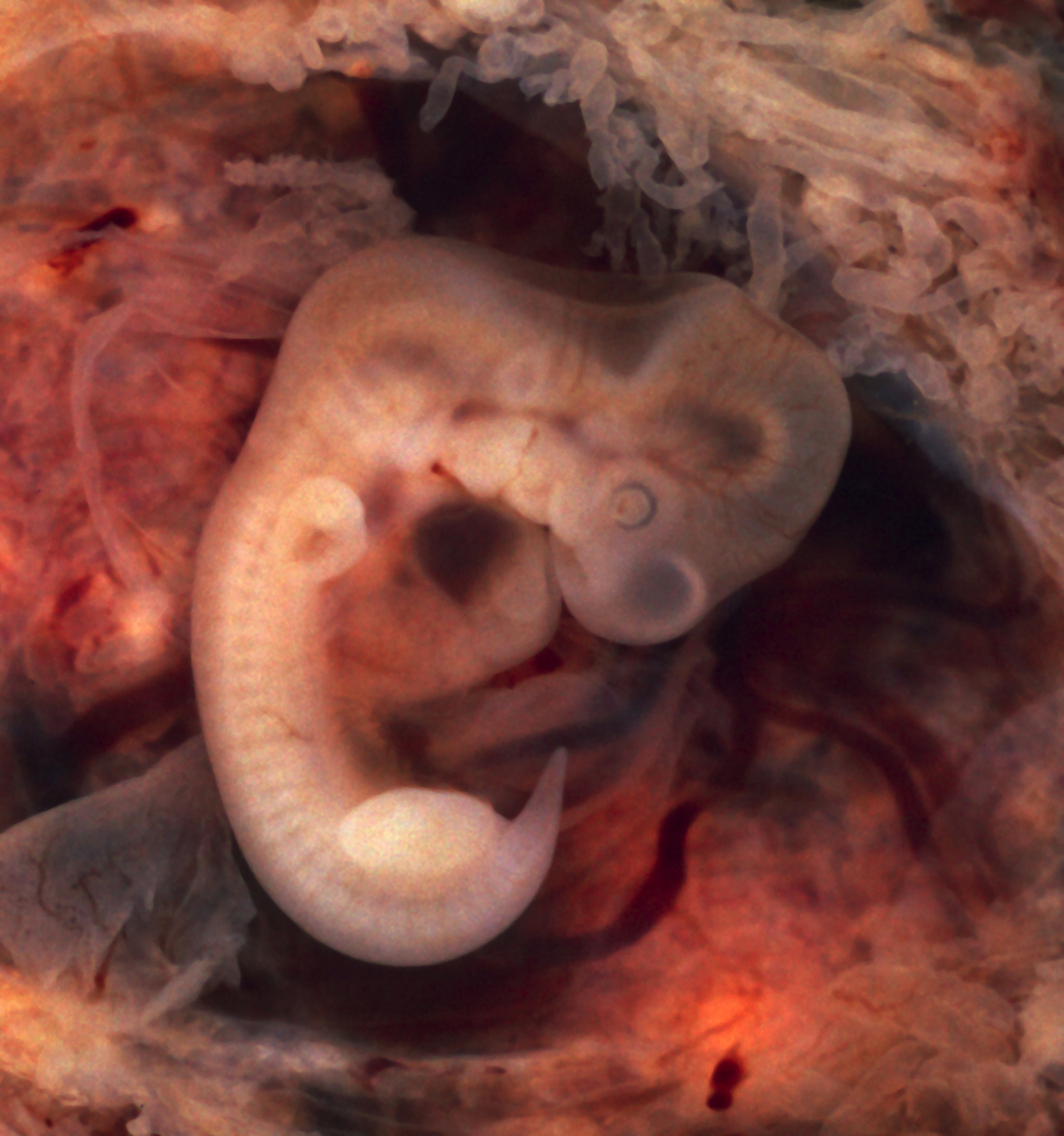
An opened oviduct with an ectopic pregnancy at about seven weeks' gestational age

The rate of ectopic pregnancy is between about 1% and 2% of live births in developed countries, though it is as high as 4% in pregnancies involving assisted reproductive technology. Between 93% and 97% of ectopic pregnancies are located in a fallopian tube. Of these, in turn, 13% are located in the isthmus, 75% are located in the ampulla, and 12% in the fimbriae. Ectopic pregnancy is responsible for 6% of maternal deaths during the first trimester of pregnancy making it the leading cause of maternal death during this stage of pregnancy.

Between 5% and 42% of women seen for ultrasound assessment with a positive pregnancy test have a pregnancy of unknown location, that is, a positive pregnancy test but no pregnancy visualized at transvaginal ultrasonography. Between 6% and 20% of pregnancies of unknown location are subsequently diagnosed with actual ectopic pregnancy.

== Society and culture ==
Salpingectomy as a treatment for ectopic pregnancy is one of the common cases when the principle of double effect can be used to justify accelerating the death of the embryo by doctors and patients opposed to outright abortions.

In the Catholic Church, there are moral debates on certain treatments. A significant number of Catholic moralists consider the use of methotrexate and the salpingostomy procedure to be not "morally permissible" because they destroy the embryo; however, situations are considered differently in which the mother's health is endangered, and the whole fallopian tube with the developing embryo inside is removed.

Organizations exist that provide information and support to help those who experience ectopic pregnancy. Studies show that people can experience post-traumatic stress, depression, and anxiety for which they would need specialist therapies. Partners can also experience post-traumatic stress.

== History ==
Until 1888, surgical treatment of ruptured ectopic pregnancies was either not considered at all, or did not save the woman's life due to blood loss. Surgeon Robert Lawson Tait, who performed the first successful surgery, initially refused to consider surgery; however, after participating in the autopsy of a young woman who died of a ruptured ectopic pregnancy, he determined how it could be surgically repaired. His first patient died, but most of the subsequent ones survived.

== Live birth ==
The vast majority of ectopic pregnancies cannot produce a viable fetus or a live birth, as the fetus cannot find a sufficient blood supply and its growth puts the mother's life at risk. In very rare cases, the fetus can implant in a location where it poses little risk to the mother and finds sufficient blood supply to grow to term. In these cases, the ectopic pregnancy can lead to a live baby surgically delivered by laparotomy.

Date	Title	Author	Journal	Fetal Survival	Maternal Survival	Gestational Age at Birth	DOI
	Advanced tubal pregnancy with a live birth at 42 + 0 weeks gestation in Tanzania: A case report	Nelen et al.	SAGE Open Medical Case Reports	1	1	42+0	10.1177/2050313X261457207
2026	Case of a Cesarean Scar Pregnancy Resulting in a Live Birth After in Vitro Fertilization	Izumi et al.	Tokai Journal of Experimental and Clinical Medicine	1	1	32+3	
2026	Successful live birth following robotic-assisted management of a cesarean scar pregnancy: a promising pathway	Iannaccone et al.	Journal of Gynecology Obstetrics and Human Reproduction	1	1	25+3	10.1016/j.jogoh.2026.103131
2026	Mesh closure of a protruding caesarean scar pregnancy in the 11th week of pregnancy	Vural et al.	BMC Pregnancy and Childbirth	1	1	32	10.1186/s12884-026-09544-w
2026	Expectant management of advanced abdominal pregnancy with successful outcome: A case report and literature review	Opoku-Achampong et al.	Women's Health	1	1	32	10.1177/17455057261446946
2026	Advanced primary abdominal pregnancy with a live birth: a case report	Elfaham et al.	Case Reports in Perinatal Medicine	1	1		10.1515/crpm-2026-0004
2026	Successful delivery of a live infant from an advanced abdominal pregnancy: a case report from MSF mother and child hospital, Kenema, Sierra Leone	Authors in linked article	Oxford Medical Case Reports	1	1	32	10.1093/omcr/omag206
2026	A-2.8 Kg Neonate Born from Neglected Advanced Abdominal Ectopic Pregnancy: A Case Report	Tilahun et al.	Ethiopian Journal of Reproductive Health	1	1	~36–38	10.69614/ejrh.v18i04.1055
2026	Advanced abdominal pregnancy with successful live newborn: a case report	Irumva A; Temesgen FG	Rwanda Medical Journal	1	1	35+3	10.4314/rmj.v82i4.1
2025	Intraoperative Encounter of a Live Term Abdominal Pregnancy: A Rare Case Report from Rwanda	Arusi et al.	International Journal of Women's Health	1	1	37	10.2147/IJWH.S538311
2025	Term Delivery of a Caesarean Scar Niche Pregnancy	Panhwar et al.	Cureus	1	1	37	10.7759/cureus.97062
2025	From High Risk to Hope: Live Birth from Cesarean Scar Pregnancy with Placenta Percreta	Sabeti et al.	Journal of Reproduction & Infertility	1	1	32	10.18502/jri.v26i2.19438
2025	Full-Term, Unexpected, Abdominal Ectopic Pregnancy in a 38-Year-Old Patient With Leiomyomas	Sadek Azar et al.	Cureus	1	1	40	10.7759/cureus.80066
2025	Tubal pregnancy delivered at term of a live birth: a case report	Onuh et al.	Journal of Surgical Case Reports	1	1	34+4	10.1093/jscr/rjaf687
2025	A live advanced intra-abdominal pregnancy in Sarawak General Hospital: A case report	Wan Zuraida WA et al.	Medical Journal of Malaysia, 80(Suppl 5), p.48	1	1	35	
2025	Anesthesia Management of a Case of Abdominal Pregnancy Discovered Intraoperatively During an Emergency Cesarean Section: A Rare and Challenging Case	Authors in linked article	Cureus	1	1	Term	10.7759/cureus.97818
2025	Embarazo ectópico abdominal a término	Yela-Narváez et al.	Casos Clínicos de Ginecología y Obstetricia de México	1	1	Term	10.24245/gom.v2i6.9453
2025	Abdominal pregnancy: a case of successful delivery	Serebrennikova ES et al.	Obstetrics and Gynecology (Russia)	1	1	31	10.18565/aig.2025.45
2025	Abdominal pregnancy in early and late gestation	Belokrinitskaya TE et al.	Obstetrics and Gynecology (Russia)	1	1	34	10.18565/aig.2025.18
2025	Full-term Abdominal Pregnancy with Live Child: About a Case in the Service of Gynecology-Obstetrics at the Ignace Deen National Hospital, Conakry / Guinea	Sow IS et al.	Journal of Gynecology and Obstetrics	1	1	37	10.11648/j.jgo.20251302.13
2025	Multidisciplinary team management of caesarean scar ectopic pregnancy progressing to a live birth and caesarean hysterectomy at 34 weeks: A case report	Xue R, Gu W, Lang X	Case Reports in Women’s Health	1	1	34	10.1016/j.crwh.2025.e00746
2024	Abdominal Ectopic Pregnancy: A Case Report of an Uncommon Complication of Pregnancy Without Prenatal Care	Durden et al.	Cureus	1	1	37	10.7759/cureus.68478
2024	Chronicles of an uncommon term abdominal pregnancy with successful outcome: a case report	Magezi et al.	BMC Pregnancy and Childbirth	1	1	38	10.1186/s13256-023-04312-2
2024	Term abdominal pregnancy with a live fetus incidentally found during cesarean section: a case report	Gebretensaye et al.	International Medical Case Reports Journal	1	1	37	10.2147/IMCRJ.S500669
2024	Primary abdominal pregnancy with a viable fetus: clinical case of successful management	Donel et al.	SECHENOV MEDICAL JOURNAL	1	1	33	10.47093/2218-7332.2024.15.3.58-64
2024	Challenges and perspectives of abdominal pregnancy in a resource-limited setting A case series	Christian-Bardol et al.	International Journal of Surgery Case Reports	1	1	40	10.1016/j.ijscr.2024.109282
2024	Broad ligament ectopic pregnancy with full-term live birth: a rare case report from Syria	Mohaisen et al.	Journal of Surgical Case Reports	1	1	37	10.1093/jscr/rjae755
2024	Rupture of non-communicating rudimentary horn at 35 weeks ending with a live birth: A case report	Taifour et al.	International Journal of Surgery Case Reports	1	1	35	10.1016/j.ijscr.2024.109641
2024	Term Abdominal Pregnancy with Live Baby; Case Report from St Padre Pio Hospital Akwa Nord Douala (August 2024)	Bernard DK et al.	Advances in Reproductive Sciences	1	1	38	10.4236/arsci.2024.124019
2024	Natural evolution of a cesarean scar pregnancy up to 34 weeks complicated by an early subserosal uterine rupture and placenta accreta spectrum disorders	Ndiaye MD et al.	Journal of Case Reports and Images in Obstetrics and Gynecology	1	1	34	10.5348/100187Z08MN2024CR
2024	Successful delivery in a cornual pregnancy after expectant management with traditional Chinese medicine and low-molecular-weight heparin: A case report	Lin X, Fu Y, Lin R, Cai X, Zhang M	Medicine (Baltimore)	1	1	40+3	10.1097/MD.0000000000040446
2023	Rudimentary horn pregnancy, a differential diagnosis of an intraabdominal pregnancy: a case report	Bidiga et al.	Journal of Medical Case Reports	1	1	28	10.1186/s13256-023-03882-5
2023	Surviving Fetus from a Full Term Abdominal Pregnancy	Legesse et al.	International Medical Case Reports Journal	1	1	37	10.2147/IMCRJ.S403180
2023	Cervical ectopic pregnancy – the first case of live birth and uterus-conserving management	Köninger et al.	BMC Pregnancy and Childbirth	1	1	30	10.1186/s12884-023-05951-5
2023	Undiagnosed Term Abdominal Pregnancy in a District-Level Hospital of a Developing Country: A Miracle Baby	Than et al.	Cureus	1	1	38	10.7759/cureus.35092
2023	A Clinical and Ethical Dilemma: Expectant Management for Ectopic Pregnancy With a Vital Fetus in a Low-Resource Setting	Orsi et al.	Journal of Clinical Medicine	1	1	34	10.3390/jcm12175642
2023	Abdominal pregnancy secondary to uterine horn pregnancy: a case report	Xingju Zheng et al.	BMC Pregnancy and Childbirth	1	1	29	10.1186/s12884-023-05704-4
2023	Abdominal pregnancy: a case report and review of 17 cases	Chen et al.	Archives of Gynecology and Obstetrics	1	17	32	10.1007/s00404-022-06570-9
2023	Survival of a fetus after advanced abdominal pregnancy-challenging obstetric concern: a case report	Alam and Akter	International Journal of Reproduction, Contraception, Obstetrics and Gynecology	1	1	~36	10.18203/2320-1770.ijrcog20230551
2023	Successful Management of An Advanced Abdominal Pregnancy With A Viable Fetus: A Case Report	Almeida GV et al.	Journal of Medical Case Reports and Case Series	1	1		10.38207/JMCRCS/2023/NOV041902144
2022	A unique case of coexisting intrauterine and abdominal pregnancy which progress to term with a positive birth outcome	Utalo and Getu	BMC Pregnancy and Childbirth	1	1	38	10.1186/s12884-022-04561-x
2022	Advanced Abdominal Ectopic Pregnancy with Subsequent Fetal and Placental Extraction: A Case Report	Zuniga et al.	Biomedicine Hub	1	1	35	10.1159/000521733
2022	Histopathological features in advanced abdominal pregnancies co-infected with SARS-CoV-2 and HIV-1 infections: A case evaluation	Ramphal et al.	European Journal of Obstetrics & Gynecology and Reproductive Biology: X	4	4	30-37	10.1016/j.eurox.2022.100153
2021	Hemoperitoneum during removal of the placenta in advanced abdominal pregnancy with live fetus delivered at 37 weeks of gestation. A case report in a low-resource setting and literature review	Muroni et al.	International Journal of Surgery Case Reports	1	1	37	10.1016/j.ijscr.2021.105694
2021	Term Abdominal Pregnancy with Live Baby: Case Report from Hiwot Fana Specialized University Hospital, Eastern Ethiopia	Gure et al.	International Medical Case Reports Journal	1	1	9 mo	10.2147/IMCRJ.S331195
2021	Undiagnosed advanced abdominal pregnancy: a case report	Ayegbusi et al.	International Journal of Scientific Reports	1	1	38	10.18203/issn.2454-2156.IntJSciRep20214496
2021	Broad Ligament Pregnancy: Facing the Battle Unarmed	Singh et al.	Maternal-Fetal Medicine	1	1	28	10.1097/FM9.0000000000000122
2021	Diagnosis pitfall of interstitial pregnancy: A case report of a term pregnancy with abnormal placentation	Najib et al.	BMC Pregnancy and Childbirth	1	1	38	10.1186/s12884-021-04153-1
2021	Expectant management of a viable Cesarean scar pregnancy complicated by uterine dehiscence and massive hemorrhage: a case report and literature review	Giroux M, Kamencic H, Fras T et al.	Gynecology and Pelvic Medicine	1	1	27+6	10.21037/gpm-19-39
2020	Term Spontaneous Heterotopic Pregnancy (Abdominal and Intrauterine): A Case Report	Momtahan et al.	Bulletin of Emergency and Trauma	1	1	36	10.30476/BEAT.2021.86588.1153
2020	Late abdominal pregnancy in a postconflict context: case of a mistaken acute abdomen - a case report	Paluku et al.	BMC Pregnancy and Childbirth	1	1	33	10.1186/s12884-020-02939-3
2020	Interstitial pregnancy in the third trimester with severe preeclampsia: A case report and literature review	Nagayama et al.	Case Reports in Obstetrics and Gynecology	1	1	28+1	10.1155/2020/9408501
2020	Successful outcome in a rare case of live post-term ovarian pregnancy	Agarwal et al.	Journal of Obstetrics and Gynaecology Research	1	1	44	10.1111/jog.14513
2020	Cesarean Scar Pregnancy Successfully Managed to Term: When the Patient Is Determined to Keep the Pregnancy	Kutlesic R, Kutlesic M, Vukomanovic P et al.	Medicina (Kaunas)	1	1	38	10.3390/medicina56100496
2020	Cesarean Scar Pregnancy Resulting in Live Birth: A Case Report	Waheed S, Fatima N, Salman A et al.	Clinics of Surgery	1	1		
2019	A rare case of term viable abdominal pregnancy with review of literature	Agarwal	Indian Journal of Case Reports	1	1	36	10.32677/ijcr.2019.v05.i06.014
2019	Full-Term Live Secondary Abdominal Pregnancy: A Rare Case Report	Gurjar	The Journal of Obstetrics and Gynecology of India	1	1	37	10.1007/s13224-018-1156-y
2019	Abdominal pregnancy with a healthy newborn: a new case	Siati et al.	Pan African Medical Journal	1	1	37	10.11604/pamj.2019.34.35.20169
2019	Abdominal pregnancy: A case report of a viable nondysmorphic fetus	Odelola et al.	Nigerian Medical Journal	1	1	33	10.4103/nmj.NMJ_26_19
2019	A CASE OF ADVANCED ABDOMINAL PREGNANCY WITH VIABLE FETUS AT TERM	Gilani and Syed	Journal of Medical Sciences	1	1	36	
2019	Undiagnosed Abdominal Term Pregnancy with Good Neonatal Outcome	Chun, et al.	Case Reports in Obstetrics and Gynecology	1	1	39	10.1155/2019/2460485
2018	Successful anesthetic management of parturient with advanced abdominal pregnancy	Kim et al.	Anesthesiology Case Reports	1	1	28	
2018	Advanced abdominal pregnancy: a search for consensus. Review of literature along with case report	Rohilla et al.	Archives of Gynecology and Obstetrics	1	1	40	10.1007/s00404-018-4743-3
2018	Expectant Management of an Abdominal Pregnancy Diagnosed at 18 Weeks: A Case Report	Silva et al.	Obstetrics & Gynecology International Journal	1	1	34	10.15406/ogij.2018.09.00295
2018	An evident asymmetrical uterus during cesarean delivery	Kakigano et al.	Clinical Case Reports	1	1	38	10.1002/ccr3.1802
2017	Term Abdominal Pregnancy Revealed by Amnioperitoneum in Rural Area	Mutarambirwa et al.	Case Reports in Obstetrics and Gynecology	1	1	39	10.1155/2017/4096783
2017	The challenge in the diagnosis and management of an advanced abdominal pregnancy in low resource settings: a case report	Tolfac et al.	Journal of Medical Case Reports	1	1	25	10.1186/s13256-017-1369-1
2017	A case report of a successfully managed advanced abdominal pregnancy with favorable fetomaternal outcomes	Osanyin et al.	Tropical Journal of Obstetrics and Gynecology	1	1	34	10.4103/tjog.tjog_9_17
2017	Advanced abdominal pregnancy, with live fetus and severe preeclampsia, case report	Hailu et al.	BMC Pregnancy and Childbirth	1	1	37	10.1186/s12884-017-1437-y
2017	A rare case of secondary live advanced abdominal pregnancy	Swain and Naik	International Journal of Reproduction, Contraception, Obstetrics and Gynecology	1	1	33	10.18203/2320-1770.ijrcog20173508
2017	Advanced ectopic abdominal pregnancy: Case report and review of the literature	Escobar-Vidarte et al.	Revista Colombiana de Obstetricia y Ginecología	2	2		10.18597/rcog.2983
2017	Placenta embolization of advanced abdominal pregnancy	Marcelin et al.	Diagnostic and Interventional Imaging	1	1	28	10.1016/j.diii.2017.12.001
2017	A live term intra-abdominal pregnancy in a Field Hospital: a case report	Abdelrahman et al.	Journal of Surgical Case Reports	1	1	35	10.1093/jscr/rjx062
2017	Full term viable secondary broad ligament pregnancy - A rare case	Sheethal and Powar	Case Reports in Women's Health	1	1	35	10.1016/j.crwh.2016.10.003
2017	Successful pregnancy located in a uterine cesarean scar: A case report	Tamada S, Masuyama H, Maki J et al.	Case Reports in Women’s Health	1	1	35+2	10.1016/j.crwh.2017.03.003
2016	A rare case of term viable abdominal pregnancy	Chaudhary and Antil	International Journal of Reproduction, Contraception, Obstetrics and Gynecology	1	1	38	10.18203/2320-1770.ijrcog20162154
2016	Secondary advanced abdominal pregnancy after suspected ruptured cornual pregnancy with good maternal outcome: a case with unusual gangrenous fetal toes and ultrasound diagnoses managed by hysterectomy	Agwani et al.	Clinical Medical Insights in Women's Health	1	1	28	10.4137/CMWH.S36311
2016	Advanced abdominal pregnancy following in vitro fertilization and embryo transfer: a case report	Giwa-Osagie et al.	Journal of Gynecology and Obstetrics	1	1	34	10.11648/j.jgo.20160401.11
2016	Conservative management and planned surgery for periviable advanced extrauterine abdominal pregnancy with favorable outcome: report of two cases	Harirah et al.	American Journal of Perinatology Reports	2	2	29 & 30	10.1055/s-0036-1588003
2016	Hydrocephalic newborn in a missed advanced abdominal pregnancy- diagnostic challenges in a rural setting: a case report	Aliyu and Ashimi	Journal of Mahatma Gandhi Institute of Medical Sciences	1	1	39	10.4103/0971-9903.178105
2016	Advanced abdominal ectopic pregnancy: a case report	Anozie et al.	Open Journal of Obstetrics and Gynecology	1	1	35	10.4236/ojog.2016.66046
2016	A term live advanced abdominal pregnancy: a rare case report	Sharma et al.	International Journal of Reproduction, Contraception, Obstetrics and Gynecology	1	1	32	10.18203/2320-1770.ijrcog20160891
2016	Acute Intestinal Obstruction Complicating Abdominal Pregnancy: Conservative Management and Successful Outcome	Udigwe et al.	Case Reports in Obstetrics and Gynecology	1	1	34	10.1155/2016/2576280
2016	A case report of an asymptomatic late term abdominal pregnancy with a live birth at 41 weeks of gestation	Nassali et al.	BMC Research Notes	1	1	41	10.1186/s13104-016-1844-6
2016	Term Live Secondary Abdominal Pregnancy: A Case Report	Pannu et al.	Malaysian Journal of Medical Science	1	1	38	10.21315/mjms2016.23.5.13
2016	FULL TERM ABDOMINAL PREGNANCY WITH LIVE FETUS, STILL AN OCCURRENCE IN CONTEMPORARY OBSTETRICS PRACTICE: A CASE REPORT	Isa et al.	Kanem Journal of Medical Sciences	1	1	40	
2016	Advanced abdominal pregnancy with a healthy newborn: a rare case report	Trivedi and Singh	International Journal of Reproduction, Contraception, Obstetrics and Gynecology	1	1	8 mo.	10.18203/2320-1770.ijrcog20163185
2016	Secondary abdominal pregnancy	Singh et al.	Medical Journal Armed Forces India	1	1	35	10.1016/j.mjafi.2015.03.003
2015	Hepatic Pregnancy Suspected at Term and Successful Delivery of a Live Neonate With Placental Attachment to the Right Lobe of the Liver	Brouard et al.	Obstetrics and Gynecology	1	1	37	10.1097/AOG.0000000000000703
2015	A 32- Weeks Abdominal Pregnancy with Live Foetus Presenting as Acute Abdomen: A Case Report	Ojuka et al.	East and Central African Journal of Surgery	1	1	32	
2015	Term abdominal pregnancy: a case report	Mengistu et al.	Journal of Medical Case Reports	1	1	40	10.1186/s13256-015-0635-3
2015	Advanced Abdominal Pregnancy with Successful Outcome	Bhoil et al.	International Emergency Medicine	1	1	34	10.1007/s11739-015-1339-9
2015	Advanced abdominal ectopic pregnancy: lessons from three cases from Zimbabwe and a literature appraisal of diagnostic and management challenges	Gidiri and Kanyenze	Women's Health	1	3	35	10.2217/whe.15.3
2015	Advanced abdominal pregnancy with a live foetus. Case report and review of the literature	Gélvez-Téllez	Revista Colombiana de Obstetricia y Ginecología	1	1	38	10.18597/rcog.9
2015	Intra-abdominal pregnancy	Radhakrishnan	Applied Radiology	1	1	28	10.37549/AR2182
2015	A case report: combined ovarian and intrauterine pregnancy progressed to a full-term delivery	Xie	Ultrasound in Obstetrics & Gynecology	1	1	37	10.1002/uog.15380
2015	A pre-operatively diagnosed advanced abdominal pregnancy with a surviving neonate: a case report	Gudu et al.	Journal of Medical Case Reports	1	1	37	10.1186/s13256-015-0712-7
2015	Late Abdominal Pregnancies (>=20 Weeks Gestation): A Review from 1965 to 2012	Hymel et al.	Gynecologic and Obstetric Investigation	19	19		10.1159/000381264
2014	Live Birth Following a Term Pregnancy in a Non-communicating Rudimentary Horn of a Unicornuate Uterus	Iyoke et al.	Annals of Medical & Health Sciences Research	1	1	38	10.4103/2141-9248.126622
2014	Full term extrauterine abdominal pregnancy	Ahirwar et al.	Journal of Evolution of Medical and Dental Sciences	1	1	39	10.14260/jemds/2014/2075
2014	Advanced Extrauterine Pregnancy at 33 Weeks with a Healthy Newborn	Dabiri et al.	BioMed Research International	1	1	33	10.1155/2014/102479
2014	Advanced abdominal pregnancy: an increasingly challenging clinical concern for obstetricians	Huang et al.	International Journal of Clinical and Experimental Pathology	1	1	33	
2014	Conservative management of an advanced abdominal pregnancy at 22 weeks	Marcellin et al.	American Journal of Perinatology Reports	1	1	32	10.1055/s-0034-1371749
2014	Obstetrical catastrophe averted: successful outcome of an abdominal pregnancy	Joshi et al.	American Journal of Emergency Medicine	1	1	36	10.1016/j.ajem.2014.03.041
2014	Viable abdominal pregnancy: a case report in Yaoundé (Cameroon)	Fouelifack et al.	Pan African Medical Journal	1	1	34	10.11604/pamj.2014.18.181.4294
2014	Hemoperitoneum in advanced abdominal pregnancy with a live baby: a case report	Matovelo and Ng'walida	BMC Research Notes	1	1	32	10.1186/1756-0500-7-106
2014	A Rare Case of Secondary Abdominal Pregnancy that Resulted in a Healthy Newborn	Jain et al.	Journal of Obstetrics and Gynaecology of India	1	1	33	10.1007/s13224-012-0305-y
2014	Interstitial Pregnancy Resulting in a Viable Infant Coexistent with Massive Perivillous Fibrin Deposition: A Case Report and Literature Review	Tanaka et al.	AJP Reports	1	1	32	10.1055/s-0034-1370354
2014	Live full-term ovarian ectopic pregnancy: a case report	Lee et al.	Journal of Reproductive Medicine	1	1	38+4	
2013	Role of serial MRI assessment in the management of an abdominal pregnancy	Renfroe et al.	BMJ Case Rep	1	1	24	10.1136/bcr-2013-200495
2013	Full-term abdominal extrauterine pregnancy complicated by post-operative ascites with successful outcome: a case report	Masukume et al.	Journal of Medical Case Reports	1	1	34	10.1186/1752-1947-7-10
2013	Late presentation of advanced abdominal pregnancy with live baby: A case report and literature review	Abdullahi et al.	Nigerian Journal of Basic and Clinical Sciences	1	1	33	10.4103/0331-8540.117242
2013	Sonographic diagnosis of a viable abdominal pregnancy with planned delivery after fetal lung maturation	Kim et al.	Journal of Clinical Ultrasound	1	1	34	10.1002/jcu.22010
2013	Ectopic Pregnancy Within a Cesarean Scar Resulting in Live Birth: A Case Report	Ahmadi et al.	Archives of Iranian Medicine	1	1	38	0131611/AIM.0014
2013	Advanced Abdominal Pregnancy with a Full-Term Live Fetus: Case Report	Mahbuba et al.	Faridpur Medical College Journal	1	1	38	10.3329/fmcj.v8i1.16898
2013	Successful outcome in a near term Secondary Abdominal pregnancy presenting as Diagnostic Dilemma	Pednekar et al.	Journal of Dental and Medical Sciences	1	1	35	10.9790/0853-0868386
2013	A multicentre study of advanced abdominal pregnancy: a review of six cases in a low resource setting	Aliyu and Ashimi	European Journal of Obstetrics & Gynecology and Reproductive Biology	2	5	35 & 42	10.1016/j.ejogrb.2013.05.022
2013	A true cornual (interstitial) pregnancy resulting in a viable fetus	Hill et al.	Obstetrics & Gynecology	1	1	32	10.1097/AOG.0b013e3182677a10
2013	A 34-week ovarian pregnancy: case report and review of the literature	Meşeci et al.	Journal of the Turkish-German Gynecological Association	1	1	34	10.5152/jtgga.2013.31391
2012	Intramural ectopic pregnancy with live birth at 37 weeks of gestation	Petit et al.	Archives of Gynecology and Obstetrics	1	1	37	10.1007/s00404-012-2549-2
2012	Lactogenesis Failure Following Successful Delivery of Advanced Abdominal Pregnancy	Pieh-Holder et al.	Breastfeeding Medicine	1	1	28	10.1089/bfm.2011.0131
2012	Term Viable Abdominal Pregnancy- A Case Report	Yasmin et al.	Medicine Today	1	1	40	10.3329/medtoday.v24i2.15015
2012	Advanced live intraabdominal pregnancy with good fetomaternal outcome: A case report	Sharma et al.	International Journal of Case Reports and Imaging	1	1	38	10.5348/ijcri-2012-11-209-CR-2
2012	Abdominal Pregnancy in Usmanu Dan-Fodiyo University Teaching Hospital, Sokoto: A 10-year Review	Nnadi et al.	Journal of Basic and Clinical Reproductive Sciences	1	7		10.4103/2278-960X.104294
2011	Abdominal pregnancy: A perfusion confusion?	Collins et al.	Placenta	1	1	30	10.1016/j.placenta.2011.07.032
2011	Undiagnosed case of term heterotopic pregnancy with ectopic abdominal pregnancy	Tripathi et al.	Journal of the Indian Medical Association	1	1	40	
2011	ABDOMINAL PREGNANCY A CASE REPORT	Farooq	Journal of Postgraduate Medical Institute	1	1	39	
2011	TERM ABDOMINAL PREGNANCY WITH HEALTHY NEWBORN: A CASE REPORT	Baffoe et al.	Ghana Medical Journal	1	1	38	10.4314/gmj.v45i2.68933
2011	Full-term extrauterine abdominal pregnancy: a case report	Dahab et al.	Journal of Medical Case Reports	1	1	40	10.1186/1752-1947-5-531
2011	Advanced abdominal pregnancy: a case report of good maternal and perinatal outcome	Brewster et al.	The West Indian Medical Journal	1	1	33	
2011	A 30-Year Review of Advanced Abdominal Pregnancy at the Mater Misericordiae Hospital, Awkpo, Southeastern Nigeria (1976–2006)	Sunday-Adeoye et al.	Archives of Gynecology and Obstetrics	4	19	27-38	10.1007/s00404-009-1260-4
2011	Abdominal Pregnancy in Libreville from 1999 to 2009	Bang Ntamack et al.	Journal de Gynécologie, Obstétrique et Biologie de la Reproduction	2		38-39	10.1016/j.jgyn.2011.06.014
2011	Primary unruptured full term ovarian pregnancy with live female infant: case report	Huang et al.	Archives of Gynecology and Obstetrics	1	1	36+	10.1007/s00404-010-1755-z
2010	Hepatic pregnancy managed conservatively	Ramphal et al.	Tropical Doctor	1	1	35	10.1258/td.2009.090218
2010	A rare case of intact rudimentary horn pregnancy presenting as hemoperitoneum	Jain et al.	Journal of Human Reproductive Sciences	1	1	28	10.4103/0974-1208.69335
2010	Advanced abdominal pregnancy with alive fetus : A case report and review	Paul et al.	The Orion Medical Journal	1	1	40	
2010	Advanced Undiagnosed Abdominal Pregnancy with Good Maternal & Fetal Outcome - A Case Report	Jesmin et al.	The Journal of Teachers Association RMC, Rajshahi	1	1	36	
2010	A Live Intra Abdominal Pregnancy: A Case Report	Kshirsagar et al.	The Journal of Obstetrics and Gynecology of India	1	1	32	10.1007/s13224-010-0024-1
2010	Secondary abdominal pregnancy with live birth	Muehlparzer et al.	ACTA Obstetricia et Gynecologica	1	1	34	10.1111/j.1600-0412.2010.01041.x
2010	Management of the Placenta in Advanced Abdominal Pregnancies at an East African Tertiary Referral Center	Oneko et al.	Journal of Women's Health	2	9	33 & 42	10.1089/jwh.2009.1704
2009	A rare case of term viable secondary abdominal pregnancy following rupture of a rudimentary horn: a case report	Bhandary et al.	Journal of Medical Case Reports	1	1	40	10.1186/1752-1947-3-38
2009	Extrauterine pregnancy resulting from late spontaneous rupture of an unscarred gravid uterus: case report	Thomakos et al.	Clinical and Experimental Obstetrics & Gynecology	1	1	38	
2008	Abdominal Pregnancy with a Full Term Live Fetus: Case Report	Isah et al.	Annals of African Medicine	1	1	39	10.4103/1596-3519.55653
2008	Advanced Abdominal Pregnancy Resulting From Late Uterine Rupture	Naim et al.	Obstetrics & Gynecology	1		36	10.1097/01.AOG.0000279451.51446.c1
2008	Full-Term Abdominal Pregnancy: A Case Report and Review of the Literature	Zhang et al.	Gynecologic and Obstetric Investigation	1	1	38	10.1159/000110015
2008	Full Term Primary Ovarian Pregnancy with Living Child and Mother	Meethong and Chalermsanyakorn	Thai Journal of Obstetrics and Gynaecology	1	1	Term	
2007	Advanced Combined Abdominal and Intrauterine Pregnancy: A Case Report	Shojai et al.	Fetal Diagnosis and Therapy	1	1	33	10.1159/000097111
2007	Management of primary abdominal pregnancy: twelve years of experience in a medical centre	Shaw et al.	Acta Obstetricia et Gynecologica	1	11		10.1080/00016340701434476
2007	Lessons Learned from Four Advanced Abdominal Pregnancies at an East African Health Center	Zeck et al.	Journal of Perinatal Medicine	2	4	33-39	10.1515/JPM.2007.075
2007	Unusual Maternal Vasculature in the Placental Periphery Leading to the Diagnosis of Abdominal Pregnancy at 25 Weeks' Gestation	Sherer et al.	Journal of Clinical Ultrasound	1	1	25	10.1002/jcu.20375
2007	A viable secondary intra-abdominal pregnancy resulting from rupture of uterine scar: role of MRI	Teng et al.	British Journal of Radiology	1	1		10.1259/bjr/67136731
2007	Unruptured term pregnancy with a live fetus with placenta percreta in a non-communicating rudimentary horn	Patra et al.	Congenital Anomalies (Kyoto)	1	1	37	10.1111/j.1741-4520.2007.00163.x
2007	Unruptured postdated pregnancy with a live fetus in a noncommunicating rudimentary horn	Goel et al.	Indian Journal of Medical Sciences	1	1	41	10.4103/0019-5359.29594
2007	Term interstitial pregnancy with uterine conservation	Ng et al.	International Journal of Gynecology & Obstetrics	1	1	38	10.1016/j.ijgo.2007.05.034
2006	Full Term Secondary Abdominal Pregnancy	Farhat and Roohi	Professional Medical Journal	1	1	36	
2006	The value of magnetic resonance imaging in the diagnosis and management of extra-uterine abdominal pregnancy	Lockhat et al.	Clinical Radiology	8	9		10.1016/j.crad.2005.10.013
2006	Term Asymptomatic Abdominal Pregnancy with Good Maternal and Perinatal Outcome: A Case Report	Motazedian et al.	Iranian Journal of Medical Sciences	1	1	37	
2005	Abdominal Pregnancy at the University College Hospital, Ibadan: A Ten-Year Review	Ayinde et al.	African Journal of Reproductive Health	1	13	34	10.2307/3583166
2005	Abdominal pregnancy: full-term viable baby	Xiao	European Journal of Obstetrics & Gynecology and Reproductive Biology	1	1	term	10.1016/j.ejogrb.2004.04.027
2005	Advanced abdominal pregnancy: still an occurrence in modern medicine	Roberts et al.	Australian and New Zealand Journal of Obstetrics and Gynaecology	1	1	35	10.1111/j.1479-828X.2005.00489.x
2005	Subperitoneal Placenta Accreta Succenturiate in the Case of a Successful Near-Term Extrauterine Abdominal Pregnancy	Godyn et al.	Human Pathology	1	1	37	10.1016/j.humpath.2005.05.020
2005	Full term ovarian pregnancy: a case report	Sehgal et al.	Australian and New Zealand Journal of Obstetrics and Gynaecology	1	1	Term	10.1111/j.1479-828X.2005.00358.x
2004	Massive Hemorrhage in a Previously Undiagnosed Abdominal Pregnancy Presenting for Elective Cesarean Delivery	Ramachandran and Kirk	Canadian Journal of Anesthesia	1	1	38	10.1007/BF03018548
2003	Full-term viable abdominal pregnancy: a case report and review	Badria et al.	Archives of Gynecology and Obstetrics	1	1	38	10.1007/s00404-002-0363-y
2003	Surgical packing as a means of controlling massive haemorrhage in association with advanced abdominal pregnancy	Farag et al.	European Journal of Obstetrics & Gynecology and Reproductive Biology	1	1	38	10.1016/s0301-2115(02)00483-9
2002	A New Case of Abdominal Pregnancy	Mahi et al.	Journal de Radiologie	1		term	
2002	Uterine Artery Doppler Patterns in Abdominal Pregnancy	Acácio	Ultrasound in Obstetrics & Gynecology	1	1	29	10.1046/j.1469-0705.2002.00769.x
2001	Fullterm Abdominal Pregnancy, Mother and Infant Survival	Echenique-Elizondo and Carbonero	Journal of the American College of Surgeons	1	1	term	10.1016/s1072-7515(00)00784-5
2001	Cervico-isthmic pregnancy: An extremely rare case diagnosed during labour	Mesogitis et al.	European Journal of Obstetrics & Gynecology and Reproductive Biology	1	1	37+2	10.1016/S0301-2115(01)00325-6
2000	Abdominal Pregnancy: A Case Report and Literature Review	Ang et al.	Singapore Medical Journal	1	1	38	
2000	Advanced Abdominal Pregnancy: A Study of 13 Consecutive Cases Seen in 1993 and 1994 at Komfo Anokye Teaching Hospital, Kumasi, Ghana	Opare-Addo and Deganus	African Journal of Reproductive Health	5	11		10.2307/3583240
2000	Undiagnosed Abdominal Pregnancy Masquerading as Faecal Fistula in a Simultaneous Intra Uterine and Abdominal Pregnancies--A Case Report	Adesunkanmi et al.	West African Journal of Medicine	1	1		
1999	The Forgotten Child—A Case of Heterotopic, Intra-abdominal and Intrauterine Pregnancy Carried to Term	Ludwig et al.	Human Reproduction	2	1	38	10.1093/humrep/14.5.1372
1999	Survival of cornual (interstitial) pregnancy	Idama et al.	European Journal of Obstetrics & Gynecology and Reproductive Biology	1	1	30	10.1016/s0301-2115(98)00269-3
1998	Abdominal Pregnancy, Institutional Experience	Bonfante Ramírez et al.	Ginecología y Obstetricia de México	1	6	term	
1998	Full-term interstitial pregnancy with live birth	Nishikawa A, Tanaka S, Kudo R	International Journal of Gynecology & Obstetrics	1		Term	10.1016/S0020-7292(98)00103-9
1997	Advanced Abdominal Pregnancy in an Ethiopian Mother: Case Report	Deneke	East African Medical Journal	1	1		
1997	A case of advanced viable extrauterine pregnancy	Sapuri and Klufio	Papua New Guinea Medical Journal	1	1	35	
1997	Survival of intrauterine twins and an interstitial singleton fetus from a heterotopic in vitro fertilisation-embryo transfer pregnancy	Luckas et al.	BJOG: An International Journal of Obstetrics & Gynaecology	3	1	30	10.1111/j.1471-0528.1997.tb11993.x
1997	Live infant salvaged from a ruptured cornual (interstitial) pregnancy at 33-weeks gestation	Ugwumadu et al.	International Journal of Gynecology & Obstetrics	1	1	33	10.1016/S0020-7292(97)00089-1
1996	Advanced abdominal pregnancy in the developing countries	Ahmed et al.	Journal of Obstetrics and Gynaecology	3	12		10.3109/01443619609030058
1996	Advanced abdominal pregnancy: difficulties in diagnosis	Acheson et al.	Journal of Obstetrics and Gynaecology	2	3		10.3109/01443619609020711
1996	Sonographic Follow-up of a Placenta Left In Situ After Delivery of the Fetus in an Abdominal Pregnancy	Bajo et al.	Ultrasound in Obstetrics & Gynecology	1	1	34	10.1046/j.1469-0705.1996.07040285.x
1996	Antenatal Diagnosis of a Late Abdominal Pregnancy Using Ultrasound and Magnetic Resonance Imaging: A Case Report of Successful Outcome	Hall et al.	Ultrasound in Obstetrics & Gynecology	1	1	35	10.1046/j.1469-0705.1996.07040289.x
1994	Advanced abdominal intraligamentary pregnancy with live birth	Mittal et al.	International Journal of Gynecology & Obstetrics	1	1	30	10.1016/0020-7292(94)90415-4
1993	Abdominal Pregnancy with Fetal Survival. A Report of 2 Cases	Lastra Lastra et al.	Ginecología y Obstetricia de México	2			
1992	Abdominal Pregnancy. Six Personal Cases	Cetin et al.	Revue Française de Gynécologie et d'Obstétrique	2	5	term	
1990	Magnetic Resonance Imaging of a Third Trimester Abdominal Pregnancy	Murphy et al.	Magnetic Resonance Imaging	1	1	32	10.1016/0730-725x(90)90146-s
1989	Advanced Abdominal Pregnancy - A Review of 23 Cases	White	Dublin Journal of Medical Science	5	23		10.1007/BF02942151
1989	Advanced abdominal pregnancy: diagnosis and management	Ubels	Tropical Doctor	2	2	term	10.1177/004947558901900212
1989	Is there a greater incidence of abdominal pregnancy in developing countries? Report of four cases	Alto	The Medical Journal of Australia	2		term	10.5694/j.1326-5377.1989.tb101226.x
1988	Abdominal Pregnancy: Current Concepts of Management	Martin et al.	Obstetrics & Gynecology	1	15		
1988	Diagnosis of a viable abdominal pregnancy by magnetic resonance imaging	Harris et al.	American Journal of Obstetrics and Gynecology	1	1	29	10.1016/0002-9378(88)90511-x
1988	Expectant management of abdominal pregnancy. A report of two cases.	Hage et al.	The Journal of Reproductive Medicine	2	2	28.5 & 33	
1988	Normal Placental Function and Fetoplacental Blood Circulation in Advanced Abdominal Pregnancy	Kirkinen et al.	Acta Obstetricia et Gynecologica Scandinavica	1	1		10.3109/00016348809004221
1987	Cervical pregnancy: Case reports and current concepts in diagnosis and treatment	Hofmann et al.	Archives of Gynecology and Obstetrics	1	1	32+3	10.1007/BF00931444
1986	Advanced Abdominal Pregnancy in Muhimbili Medical Centre, Tanzania	Mbura and Mgaya	International Journal of Gynecology & Obstetrics	6	15		10.1016/0020-7292(86)90094-9
1986	Long-term Follow-up After Removal of an Abdominal Pregnancy: Ultrasound Evaluation of the Involuting Placenta	Belfar et al.	Journal of Ultrasound in Medicine	1	1	30	10.7863/jum.1986.5.9.521
1986	A Unique Case of Abdominal Pregnancy: What Are the Minimal Requirements for Placental Contact with the Maternal Vascular Bed?	Norén and Lindblom	American Journal of Obstetrics and Gynecology	1	1	38	10.1016/0002-9378(86)90839-2
1985	Abdominal pregnancy: A study of twenty-one consecutive cases	Hallatt and Grove	American Journal of Obstetrics and Gynecology	1	21		10.1016/s0002-9378(85)80155-1
1985	Live abdominal pregnancy presenting as massive rectal bleeding	Bornman et al.	Postgraduate Medical Journal	1	1	34	10.1136/pgmj.61.718.759
1985	MR Imaging of a Viable Full-Term Abdominal Pregnancy	Cohen et al.	American Journal of Roentgenology	1	1	term	10.2214/ajr.145.2.407
1985	Primary hepatic pregnancy	Shukla et al.	Postgraduate Medical Journal	1	1	28	10.1136/pgmj.61.719.831
1985	Cervico-isthmic pregnancy ending with the delivery of a live-born infant in late second trimester	Cohen et al.	European Journal of Obstetrics & Gynecology and Reproductive Biology	1	1	26+2	10.1016/0028-2243(85)90084-X
1985	Intraligamentary pregnancy resulting in a live infant	Vierhout ME, Wallenburg HC	American Journal of Obstetrics and Gynecology	1			10.1016/S0002-9378(85)80081-8
1984	Die abdominale Gravidität: Fallbericht und Literaturübersicht [The Abdominal Pregnancy: Case Report and Literature Review]	Golz et al.	Geburtshilfe und Frauenheilkunde	1	2	29	10.1055/s-2008-1036526
1983	Abdominal Pregnancy: A Case Report and a Brief Review of the Literature	Bendvold and Raabe	Acta Obstetricia et Gynecologica Scandinavica	1	1	35	10.3109/00016348309156244
1982	Abdominal Pregnancy: Review of Current Management and Addition of 10 Cases	Delke et al.	Obstetrics & Gynecology	2	10		
1982	Advanced Abdominal Pregnancy - Observations in 10 Cases	Rahman et al.	Obstetrics & Gynecology	6	8		
1982	Term ovarian pregnancy with delivery of a live female infant	Williams et al.	American Journal of Obstetrics and Gynecology	1	1	Term	10.1016/0002-9378(82)90766-9
1981	Sonographic Findings in Advanced Abdominal Pregnancy	Blackwelder et al.	American Journal of Roentgenology	1	1	38	10.2214/ajr.137.6.1259
1980	Maternal Plasma and Urinary Hormone Levels During and After a Successful Abdominal Pregnancy	France and Jackson	British Journal of Obstetrics and Gynaecology	1	1	36	10.1111/j.1471-0528.1980.tb04558.x
1979	Intrauterine to Intraabdominal Pregnancy: Ultrasound Demonstration	Sauerbrei et al.	American Journal of Roentgenology	1	1	34	10.2214/ajr.133.1.132
1978	Rudimentary Horn Pregnancy with Neonatal and Maternal Survival	O'Grady and Salem	Journal of the National Medical Association	1	1	39	
1977	Abdominal Pregnancy	Strafford and Ragan	Obstetrics & Gynecology	1	9	44	
1977	Undiagnosed Abdominal Pregnancy with Inadvertent Prostaglandin Administration	Hersh et al.	American Journal of Obstetrics and Gynecology	1	3	41.5	10.1016/0002-9378(77)90829-8
1976	Ectopic pregnancy carried to full term with a living infant [Article in German]	Holzer and Pickel	Zentralblatt für Gynäkologie	1	1	term	
1974	Follow-Up of Live Extra-Uterine Pregnancies	Gaither and Clark	Journal of the National Medical Association	7			
1971	Advanced Abdominal Pregnancy: Three Cases with a Review of the Literature	Santos-Dias	South African Medical Journal	2	3	36-39	
1969	The Paediatric Aspects of Advanced Abdominal Pregnancy	Tan et al.	Journal of Obstetrics and Gynaecology of the British Commonwealth	5			10.1111/j.1471-0528.1969.tb09471.x
1967	Abdominal Pregnancy: Report of 12 Cases	Foster and Moore	Obstetrics & Gynecology	8	11	39	
1965	Pelvic Angiography in the Management of Abdominal Pregnancy	Haber and Wilson	Radiology	1	1	33	10.1148/85.5.904
1963	The Treatment of Abdominal Pregnancies	Shelton	South African Medical Journal	4	17		
1962	Abdominal pregnancy at Charity Hospital in New Orleans	Beacham et al.	American Journal of Obstetrics and Gynecology	8	7		10.1016/s0002-9378(16)35733-7
1960	Advanced Extrauterine Pregnancy	Dixon and Stewart	British Medical Journal	5	10		10.1136/bmj.2.5206.1103
1959	Endocrine Studies in Two Instances of Term Abdominal Pregnancy	Siegler et al.	American Journal of Obstetrics and Gynecology	1	2	term	10.1016/0002-9378(59)90188-7
1958	A Case of Intra-abdominal Pregnancy with Follow-up Tests for Disappearance of Placental Activity	Weinberg et al.	American Journal of Obstetrics and Gynecology	1	1	38	10.1016/0002-9378(58)90068-1
1957	The Management of Secondary Abdominal Pregnancy	Hibbard	American Journal of Obstetrics and Gynecology	2	22	28, 35	10.1016/0002-9378(57)90506-9
1952	Abdominal Pregnancy Secondary to Rupture of Accessory Uterus with Survival of Mother and Infant	Bourgeois and Shapiro	New England Journal of Medicine	1	1	39	10.1056/NEJM195207172470303
1950	Combined (Intra- and Extra-Uterine) Full-Term Living Pregnancies	Theron	South African Medical Journal	1	1	term	
1948	Two Unusual Cases of Abdominal Extrauterine Pregnancy	Billington and Goodchild	British Medical Journal	1	2	term	10.1136/bmj.2.4582.787
1947	Advanced Abdominal Pregnancy	Branscomb	American Journal of Obstetrics and Gynecology	2	2		10.1016/s0002-9378(16)39666-1
1947	Full Term Intra-Abdominal Pregnancy with Living Mother and Child	Teh	American Journal of Obstetrics and Gynecology	1	1	35	
1946	Abdominal Pregnancy: A Review of Present Knowledge Based Partly on Reported Cases and Partly on the Experience of the Charity Hospital of Louisiana at New Orleans During the Period July 1, 1937 through June 30, 1945	Beacham et al.	Obstetric and Gynecologic Survey	4	19		10.1097/00006254-194612000-00001
1944	Abdominal Pregnancy: Survey of the Literature and Report of an Unusual Case	Gardner and Middlebrook	American Journal of Surgery	1	1	term	10.1016/s0002-9610(44)90174-1
1942	Full-term Abdominal Pregnancy with Survival of Mother and Child	M. L. Slotover	British Medical Journal	1	1	37	10.1136/bmj.1.4247.669
1938	A Case of Abdominal Pregnancy	Reid	British Medical Journal	1	1		
1935	Full Term Intra-Abdominal Pregnancy	Hellman and Simon	American Journal of Surgery	1	1	40	10.1016/s0002-9610(35)91078-9
1935	Abdominal Pregnancy: Report of a Case with a Full Term Living Infant and Recovery of the Mother	Eisaman and Ziegler	JAMA	1	1	term	10.1001/jama.1935.92760240005011b
1917	Transplantation of Ectopic Pregnancy from Fallopian Tube to Cavity of Uterus	Wallace	Surgery, Gynecology and Obstetrics	1	1	term	
1913	Abdominal Pregnancy with a Living Child	Horsley	Transactions of the Southern Surgical and Gynecological Association (Vol. XXV)	1	1	term	

== Animals ==
Ectopic gestation exists in mammals other than humans. In sheep, it can go to term, with mammary preparation to parturition, and expulsion efforts. The fetus can be removed by caesarean section.

== See also ==
- Indirect abortion
