= Heterotopic pregnancy =

- Ultrasound showing a heterotopic pregnancy (intrauterine + extrauterine pregnancies) with signs that the extrauterine (ectopic) pregnancy has ruptured.
- Specialty: Obstetrics

A heterotopic pregnancy is a complication of pregnancy in which both extrauterine (ectopic) pregnancy and intrauterine pregnancy occur simultaneously. It may also be referred to as a combined ectopic pregnancy, multiple‑sited pregnancy, or coincident pregnancy.

The most common site of the extrauterine pregnancy is the fallopian tube. However, other sites of implantation include the cervix, ovary, and abdomen.

Although heterotopic pregnancies were once thought to be a rare phenomenon, the incidence has increased due to the increasing use of assisted reproductive technologies.

== Cause ==
In a heterotopic pregnancy there is one fertilized ovum which implants normally in the uterus, and one fertilized ovum which implants abnormally, outside of the uterus.

== Pathogenesis ==
In the general population, the major risk factors for heterotopic pregnancy are the same as those for ectopic pregnancy:

- Previous history of ectopic pregnancy
- Tubal surgery
- Pelvic inflammatory disease
- Use of an intrauterine device
- In utero diethylstilbestrol exposure
- Smoking

Women participating in an assisted reproductive program have an increased risk of heterotopic pregnancy for several reasons including:

- Higher incidence of ovulation due to treatment
- Multiple embryo transfers
- Technical factors in embryo transfer which may increase the risk for ectopic and heterotopic pregnancy
- Higher incidence of tubal malformation and/or tubal damage in this group
- Higher levels of estradiol and progesterone due to hormonal treatment

== Diagnosis ==
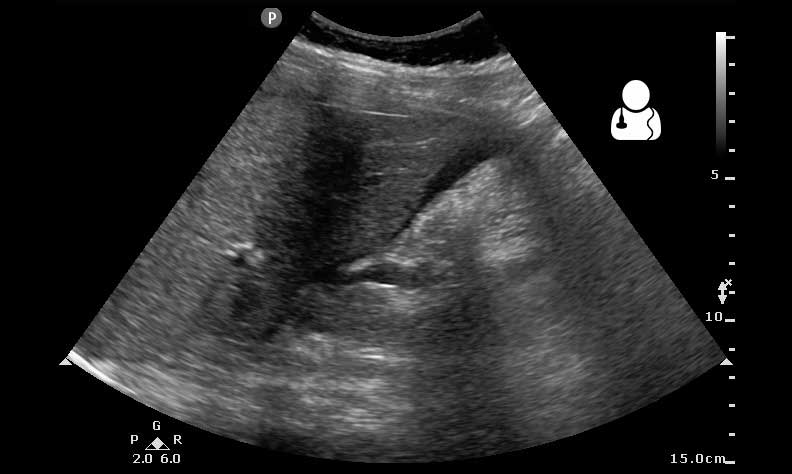
Free fluid (blood) seen between the liver and kidney in a person with a ruptured extrauterine (ectopic) pregnancy

=== Signs and symptoms ===
Heterotopic pregnancies present with unspecific clinical symptoms. This means the symptoms of a heterotopic pregnancy can be the same symptoms found in several other medical conditions. The most common clinical symptoms are abdominal pain, vaginal bleeding, enlarged uterus, and/or an adnexal mass. The vague symptoms found in heterotopic pregnancies can contribute to the delayed diagnosis of this condition, which can lead to devastating consequences, including a ruptured ectopic pregnancy.

=== Differential diagnosis ===
The signs and symptoms of a heterotopic pregnancy can be found in many other gynecological and non-gynecological conditions, including:

- Ovarian torsion
- Ovarian cyst
- Threatened abortion
- Urinary tract infection
- Kidney stones
- Constipation
- Diverticulitis
- Pelvic inflammatory disease
- Bowel obstruction
- Inflammatory bowel disease

=== Ultrasound ===
The gold standard for diagnosing a heterotopic pregnancy is the transvaginal ultrasound. However, the sensitivity of the transvaginal ultrasound for diagnosing a heterotopic pregnancy has been found to range from 26.3% to 92.4%. Therefore, both clinical symptoms and ultrasound imaging are used to make the diagnosis.

== Management ==
The goal of treatment is to preserve the viable intrauterine pregnancy and to remove the nonviable ectopic pregnancy.

The standard surgical approach for removal of the nonviable ectopic pregnancy is by salpingectomy or salpingostomy.

In the case of an unruptured ectopic pregnancy, local feticidal injection can be used to remove the ectopic pregnancy. For this method, ultrasound is used to guide a needle to the ectopic pregnancy and substances such as potassium chloride and hyperosmolar glucose are injected directly into the gestational sac. The use of this method can be limited due the location of the ectopic pregnancy and the experience of the physician with this technique.

Treatment of heterotopic pregnancy will depend on the specific location of the ectopic pregnancy, as well as the pregnant person's clinical presentation and stability.

== Prognosis ==
Extrauterine pregnancies are non-viable and can be fatal to the mother if left untreated. However, successfully continuing the intrauterine pregnancy following removal of the extrauterine is possible and has a success rate of about 50 to 66%.

== Epidemiology ==
The prevalence of heterotopic pregnancy is estimated at 0.6‑2.5:10,000 pregnancies. There is a significant increase in the incidence of heterotopic pregnancy in women undergoing ovulation induction. An even greater incidence of heterotopic pregnancy is reported in pregnancies following assisted reproduction techniques such as In vitro fertilization (IVF) and gamete intrafallopian transfer (GIFT), with an estimated incidence at between 1 and 3 in 100 pregnancies. If there is embryo transfer of more than 4 embryos, the risk has been quoted as 1 in 45.

In natural conceptions, the incidence of heterotopic pregnancy has been estimated to be 1 in 30,000 pregnancies. However, due to the increasing use of assisted reproduction technology, the overall incidence is 1 in 3900 pregnancies.
