= Adhesion barrier =

An adhesion barrier is a medical implant that can be used to reduce abnormal internal scarring (adhesions) following surgery by separating the internal tissues and organs while they heal.

Surgeons have realized that proper surgical technique is crucial to reduce adhesion formation. In addition, for more than a century, adjuvants including drugs and materials such as animal membranes, gold foil, mineral oil, sheets made of rubber and Teflon, have been used to reduce the risk of adhesion formation. Nevertheless, adhesions do occur and appear to be, to some degree, an almost unavoidable consequence of abdominal and pelvic surgery. Adhesions can lead to significant post-surgical morbidity, bowel obstruction, infertility, and chronic pelvic pain or chronic abdominal pain.

Surgeons and healthcare professionals developed several methods for minimizing tissue injury in order to minimize the formation of adhesions. However, even an experienced surgeon despite using advanced techniques may not be able to fully prevent the formation of adhesions following surgery, without the aid of an adhesion barrier. Consequently, many surgeons apply adhesion barriers while performing abdominal and pelvic surgery.

However, one study found the frequency of adhesion barrier use to be very low. The study examined hospital data and found that adhesion barriers were only used in a maximum of 5% of procedures in which the use of a barrier would be appropriate.

== Description ==
Adhesion barriers are physical films, fabrics, gels or other materials that are applied between layers of tissues at the end of a surgery before the incision site is closed. While in place, the adhesion barrier acts as a physical barrier to separate traumatized tissue surfaces so that they do not adhere to one another while the tissue surfaces heal. Once the tissue surfaces heal, which is usually between 3 and 7 days, the barrier dissolves and is absorbed by the body.

== Commercial availability ==
Global Adhesion Barrier Market Size is expected to reach US $ 15Mn by 2025 during the forecast period 2020 to 2025.The first commercially available adhesion barrier was probably Cargile Membrane, a preserved peritoneal membrane of the Danish Ox. Marketed by Johnson & Johnson around 1904, it was still available in the early 1990s. In the United States, Interceed, Seprafilm and Adept are the three products approved by the U.S. Food and Drug Administration (FDA) for use as an adhesion barrier after abdominal or pelvic surgery.

Seprafilm (made by Genzyme) is a clear, sticky film composed of chemically modified sugars, some of which occur naturally in the human body. It sticks to the tissues to which it is applied and is slowly absorbed into the body over a period of seven days. It is approved for use in certain types of pelvic or abdominal surgery.

Interceed (made by Johnson & Johnson) is a knitted fabric composed of a modified cellulose that swells and eventually gels after being placed on the injured site, and, like Seprafilm, forms a barrier and then is slowly absorbed over a period of days. It is approved for use in pelvic surgery. Although it is technically possible to apply either Seprafilm or Interceed laparoscopically, neither product is approved for this use in the U.S.

Adept (Baxter) is a solution of Icodextrin that when instilled in a large volume causes organs to float apart, reducing the possibility of attachment.

== Other sources ==
A number of adhesion barriers are available outside of the United States including Hyalobarrier, SprayShield, PrevAdh and INTERCOAT. Several products licensed for other uses are used off-label in the USA for adhesion prevention including Evicel, Surgiwrap, CoSeal and Preclude, the latter being a product of Gore-Tex, not being absorbed and requiring a second intervention/operation for removal.

Products available for adhesion prevention outside the abdominal and pelvic cavities inside or outside the U.S. include ADCON Gel (spine and tendon surgery), Sepragel ENT, INCERT (spine), Tenoglide (tendon), Oxiplex (Medishield) (spine) and REPEL CV (Cardiac).

Genzyme also tested a spray-on barrier called Sepraspray. The company settled a federal Department of Justice lawsuit over claims its sales representatives illegally showed hospital staff how to dissolve Seprafilm with saline into "slurry" and use it in laparoscopic surgeries, for which it was not FDA-approved.

== Evaluation ==
According to Cochrane Summaries, Gore-Tex is more effective than Interceed, but requires a second surgery for removal as it is not absorbable. Seprafilm or Fibrin sheets were not found to be effective. Vigorous follow-up is crucial, thus more studies are needed in gynecologic surgery as a major drawback of studies is that they do not incorporate the gold standard of success, namely pregnancy rates.
