= Minimally invasive surgeries =

Surgical technique that limits size of surgical incisions needed

Minimally invasive surgery
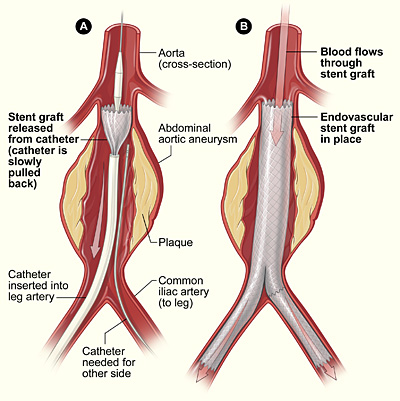
- Endovascular aneurysm repair - example of minimally invasive procedure
- MeSH: D019060
- eMedicine: 938198

Minimally invasive surgery (also known as minimally invasive procedure) encompasses surgical techniques that limit the size of incisions needed, thereby reducing wound healing time, associated pain, and risk of infection. Surgery by definition is invasive, and many operations requiring incisions of some size are referred to as open surgery. Incisions made during open surgery can sometimes leave large wounds that may be painful and take a long time to heal. Advancements in medical technologies have enabled the development and regular use of minimally invasive procedures. For example, endovascular aneurysm repair, a minimally invasive surgery, has become the most common method of repairing abdominal aortic aneurysms in the US as of 2003. The procedure involves much smaller incisions than the corresponding open surgery procedure of open aortic surgery.

Interventional radiologists were the forerunners of minimally invasive procedures. Using imaging techniques, radiologists were able to direct interventional instruments through the body by way of catheters instead of the large incisions needed in traditional surgery. As a result, many conditions once requiring surgery can now be treated non-surgically.

Diagnostic techniques that do not involve incisions, puncturing the skin, or the introduction of foreign objects or materials into the body are known as non-invasive procedures. Several treatment procedures are classified as non-invasive. A major example of a non-invasive alternative treatment to surgery is radiation therapy, also called radiotherapy.

== Medical uses ==
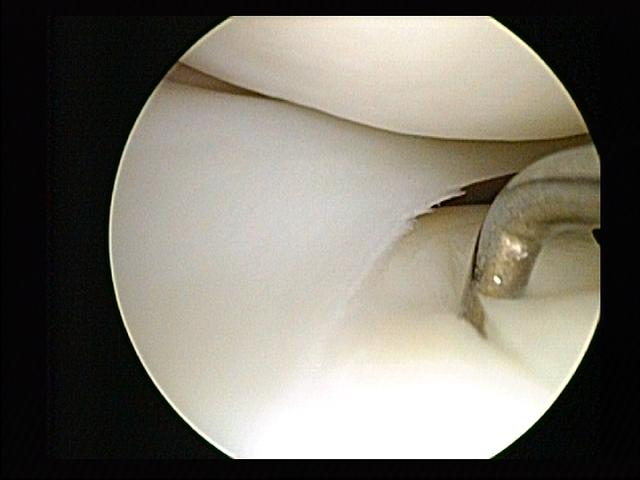
Arthroscopic surgery

Minimally invasive procedures were pioneered by interventional radiologists who had first introduced angioplasty and the catheter-delivered stent. Many other minimally invasive procedures have followed where images of all parts of the body can be obtained and used to direct interventional instruments by way of catheters (needles and fine tubes), so that many conditions once requiring open surgery can now be treated non-surgically. A minimally invasive procedure typically involves the use of arthroscopic (for joints and the spine) or laparoscopic devices and remote-control manipulation of instruments with indirect observation of the surgical field through an endoscope or large scale display panel, and is carried out through the skin or through a body cavity or anatomical opening. Interventional radiology now offers many techniques that avoid the need for surgery.

By use of a minimally invasive procedure, a patient may require only an adhesive bandage on the incision, rather than multiple stitches or staples to close a large incision. This usually results in less infection, a quicker recovery time and shorter hospital stays, or allow outpatient treatment. However, the safety and effectiveness of each procedure must be demonstrated with randomized controlled trials. The term was coined by John E. A. Wickham in 1984, who wrote of it in British Medical Journal in 1987.

== Specific procedures ==
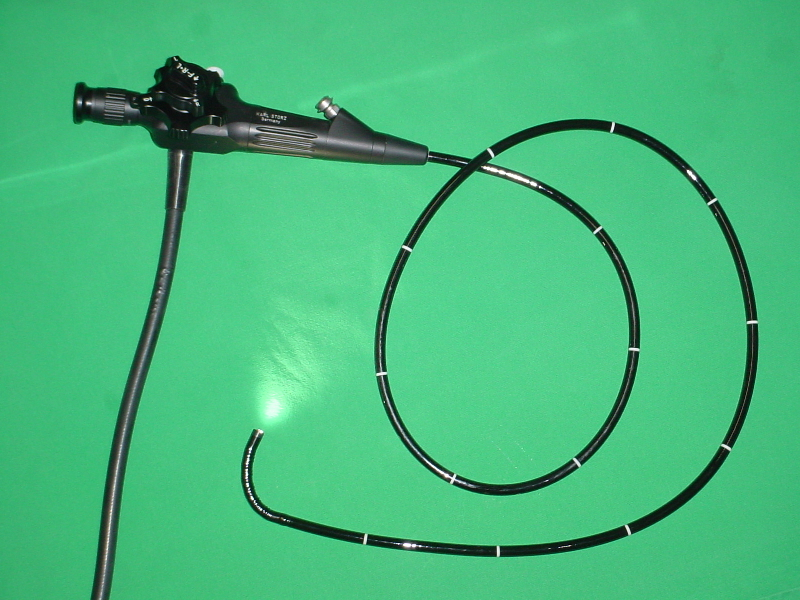
Flexible endoscope

Many medical procedures are called minimally invasive; those that involve small incisions through which an endoscope is inserted, end in the suffix -oscopy, such as endoscopy, laparoscopy, arthroscopy. Other examples of minimally invasive procedures include the use of hypodermic injection, and air-pressure injection, subdermal implants, refractive surgery, percutaneous surgery, cryosurgery, microsurgery, keyhole surgery, endovascular surgery using interventional radiology (such as angioplasty or embolization), coronary catheterization, permanent placement of spinal and brain electrodes, stereotactic surgery, the Nuss procedure, radioactivity-based medical imaging methods, such as gamma camera, positron emission tomography and SPECT (single photon emission tomography). Related procedures are image-guided surgery, and robot-assisted surgery.

== Equipment ==
Special medical equipment may be used, such as fiber optic cables, miniature video cameras and special surgical instruments handled via tubes inserted into the body through small openings in its surface. The images of the interior of the body are transmitted to an external video monitor and the surgeon has the possibility of making a diagnosis, visually identifying internal features and acting surgically on them.

== Benefits ==
Minimally invasive surgery should have less operative trauma, other complications and adverse effects than an equivalent open surgery. It may be more or less expensive (for dental implants, a minimally invasive method reduces the cost of installed implants and shortens the implant-prosthetic rehabilitation time with four–six months). Operative time is longer, but hospitalization time is shorter. It causes less pain and scarring, speeds recovery, and reduces the incidence of post-surgical complications, such as adhesions and wound rupture. Some studies have compared heart surgery.

== Risks ==
Risks and complications of minimally invasive procedures are the same as for any other surgical operation, among the risks are: death, bleeding, infection, organ injury, and thromboembolic disease.There may be an increased risk of hypothermia and peritoneal trauma due to increased exposure to cold, dry gases during insufflation. The use of surgical humidification therapy, which is the use of heated and humidified CO_{2} for insufflation, may reduce this risk.

== Invasive procedures ==
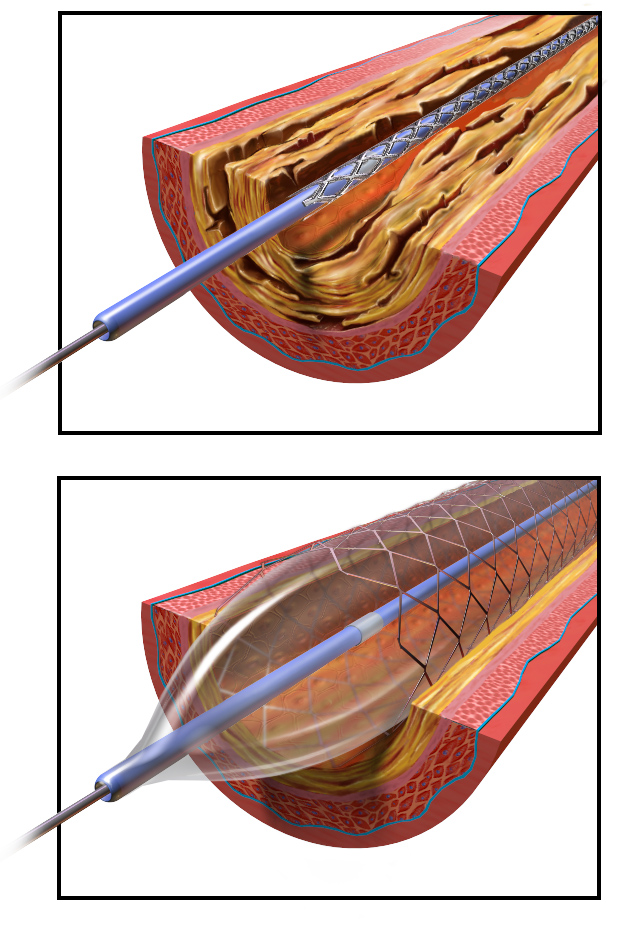
Angioplasty

Sometimes the use of non-invasive methods is not an option, so that the next level of minimally invasive techniques are looked to. These include the use of hypodermic injection (using the syringe), an endoscope, percutaneous surgery which involves needle puncture of the skin, laparoscopic surgery commonly called keyhole surgery, a coronary catheter, angioplasty and stereotactic surgery.

=== Open surgery ===
"Open surgery" is any surgical procedure where the incision made is enough to allow the surgery to take place. With tissues and structures exposed to the air, the procedure can be performed either with the unaided vision of the surgeon or with the use of loupes or microscopes. Some examples of open surgery used are for herniated disc commonly called a "slipped disc", and most types of cardiac surgery and neurosurgery.

== See also ==
- Anesthesia
- ASA physical status classification system
- Medicine
- Natural orifice translumenal endoscopic surgery
- Traumatology
- Bariatric Arterial Embolization
- Biomedical engineering
- Molecular imaging
- Venipuncture
