= Hydroflotation =

Surgical technique

Hydroflotation is a surgical technique used as intraoperative prophylaxis to prevent postoperative adhesion formation inside body cavities, by use of certain solutions. The instilled solution keeps organs in a body cavity afloat and separate from each other. This technique is very frequently used in pelvic and abdominal surgeries.

== Solutions used ==
Some of the solutions that are used include 32% Dextran (outdated and known anaphylactic), normal saline, Ringer's lactate with or without heparin (5000 IU in 200 ml) and Adept (4% icodextrin). Normal saline and Ringer's lactate are absorbed within 24 hours, while icodextrin resides for about 5–7 days, the critical time when adhesion formation takes place and it has therefore replaced most crystalloids used for this purpose.
