= Ureterolysis =

- Specialty: Urology

Ureterolysis is a surgical procedure aimed at exposing the ureter in order to free it from external pressure or adhesions or to avoid injury to it during pelvic surgery. It is most often used for hysterectomy. It is also used for endometriosis.
