= Surgical humidification =

Surgical humidification is the conditioning of insufflation gas with water vapour (humidity) and heat during surgery. Surgical humidification is used to reduce the risk of tissue drying and evaporative cooling.

== Laparoscopic surgery humidification ==
During laparoscopy (laparoscopic surgery or minimally invasive surgery), it is necessary to insufflate the abdominal cavity (i.e. inflate the abdomen like a balloon) with medical-grade carbon dioxide (CO_{2}) to create a viewing and working space for the surgery. The CO_{2} may be unconditioned, or conditioned with heat, or with humidification and heat. During insufflation, the peritoneum (an extensive delicate membrane that lines the abdominal cavity and covers most of the abdominal organs) is exposed to the CO_{2}.

Unconditioned medical-grade CO_{2} has virtually no moisture and enters the abdomen at room temperature (19 to 21 °C). The condition of the gas is dry and cold compared to that of the natural physiological state of the peritoneum which is immersed in fluid at body temperature (37 °C). Experimental and clinical investigations have demonstrated that insufflation with unconditioned CO_{2} causes evaporation of the fluid and drying of the peritoneum, resulting in inflammation and damage to its cells. Clinically, peritoneal injury caused by drying has been linked to post-operative pain, evaporative cooling resulting in a decrease in core temperature and increased risk of intra-operative hypothermia, as well as adhesion formation.

In addition, animal studies have revealed that surgical humidification reduces peritoneal tumor implantation and tumor load suggesting a possible benefit in cancer patients undergoing abdominal surgery.

Conditioning the CO_{2} with only heat causes tissue drying. Warmer gas has a greater capacity for evaporation as the gas can hold more water vapor, therefore the tissues will dry faster than when unconditioned gas is used, potentially leading to increased adverse consequences. Conditioning the CO_{2} with humidity, in combination with heat, has been shown to decrease peritoneal damage by reducing the capacity of CO_{2} to carry moisture away from the tissue. Temperature loss during surgery, due to tissue drying, can be prevented by adequately humidifying and heating the CO_{2.}

== Open (abdominal) surgery humidification ==
During open surgery the surgeon exposes the peritoneal cavity to the ambient air. Exposure to ambient air results in evaporation and cooling. Current studies have shown that the use of surgical humidification during open abdominal surgery (laparotomy) has warmer core body temperatures and reduced risk of operative hypothermia. As with any operation, maintaining patient normothermia is a critical process to prevent surgical site infections, additional respiratory distress, and surgical bleeding.

== Respiratory humidification during surgery ==
Anesthesia causes vasodilation, which increases blood flow to the surface of the body and thus increases heat loss from the body. During anesthesia, blood flow to the surface may maintain skin temperature (which is normally lower than the core temperature), even while the core temperature is falling. Barring preventive interventions, hypothermia occurs in more than half of all surgical patients undergoing anesthesia.

The risk of a loss of body temperature and hypothermia increases with the duration of surgery, especially for surgery that lasts more than one hour. Surgical hypothermia, defined as a core temperature below 36.0 °C, is associated with increased risk of infectious and non-infectious complications, longer post-operative ICU and overall hospital recovery; and more frequent requirement of transfusions. Elderly persons, especially those with lower muscle and body mass, are at greater risk of hypothermia.

Respiratory humidification during surgery helps maintain body temperature and normal function of the respiratory mucosa. In the same way that some animals pant to lose excess body heat, heat is lost through the lungs during mechanical or assisted ventilation. Heated humidification of respiratory gases during surgery has been demonstrated to reduce the fall in core body temperature, especially in surgeries lasting longer than one hour. The lungs can be insufflated with respiratory gases that are heated to near body temperature and humidified to 90 to 100% relative humidity(RH). Normally, air in the lungs is at core body temperature and at close to 100% RH. Especially when cold dry gases (such as anhydrous compressed gas from oxygen tanks) are used, it cools and can dry the airway. The body then utilizes energy to evaporate sufficient water from the lungs to maintain lung gas temperature and humidity. It is generally estimated that 10 percent of the loss of body heat during surgery is from the respiratory tract. Especially in open surgery (rather than endoscopic/robotic surgery), respiratory humidification can be used in concert with forced air warming blankets or gowns, warmed IVs, and irrigation fluids to prevent hypothermia.
