= Bariatric arterial embolization =

Minimally invasive weight loss procedure

Bariatric Arterial Embolization (BAE) is a minimally invasive interventional radiology procedure intended to promote weight loss by embolizing the arteries supplying the gastric fundus, where the hormone ghrelin is produced. BAE is considered a non-surgical alternative to bariatric surgery for the treatment of obesity.

== Overview and mechanism of action ==
BAE involves catheter-based embolization of arteries that feed the gastric fundus. By blocking blood flow to this region, the production of ghrelin (a hormone responsible for stimulating hunger) is reduced. The aim is to decrease appetite and support weight loss without surgically removing any part of the stomach. The fundus of the stomach is responsible for producing around 90% of the body's circulating ghrelin. By reducing blood flow to this area through embolization, the ghrelin output decreases, which suppresses appetite and results in weight loss.

== Clinical evidence ==
Preclinical studies and early human trials have demonstrated that BAE leads to significant weight loss and suppression of ghrelin levels. Trials such as BEAT Obesity and GET LEAN reported average weight loss of 8–14% of total body weight over a 6–12 month period.

A 2023 review also highlighted the procedure's potential, summarizing evidence from multiple clinical and animal studies.

== Candidate criteria ==
Typical candidates for BAE include:

- Adults with a BMI ≥ 30 kg/m^{2} (in some trials, ≥ 40 kg/m^{2})
- Patients unable or unwilling to undergo bariatric surgery
- Individuals with limited success from diet, exercise, or pharmacotherapy

== Benefits, limitations and integration with other treatments ==
Advantages:

- Minimally invasive
- Shorter recovery time compared to surgery
- Demonstrated safety in early trials

Limitations:

- Long-term effectiveness remains under investigation
- Potential for gastric revascularization and hunger relapse

BAE is often combined with nutritional counseling, lifestyle changes, and medications for optimal long-term outcomes.

== See also ==
- Bariatric surgery
- Ghrelin
- Interventional radiology
- Obesity
