= Icodextrin =

Pharmaceutical drug

Clinical data
- AHFS/Drugs.com: International Drug Names
- Routes of administration: Intraperitoneal
- ATC code: None

Legal status
- Legal status: In general: ℞ (Prescription only)

Pharmacokinetic data
- Bioavailability: 40% in 12 hours
- Metabolism: Alpha-amylase
- Excretion: Renal

Identifiers
- CAS Number: 337376-15-5
- PubChem SID: 17397419
- DrugBank: DB00702
- ChemSpider: none
- UNII: 2NX48Z0A9G
- KEGG: D03266
- ChEMBL: ChEMBL1201472
- CompTox Dashboard (EPA): DTXSID70872514

Chemical and physical data
- Formula: (C_{6}H_{10}O_{5})_{n}
- Molar mass: 13–19 kg/mol

Icodextrin (INN, USAN) is a colloid osmotic agent, derived from maltodextrin, used in form of an aqueous solution for peritoneal dialysis under the trade name Extraneal, and after gynecological laparoscopic surgery for the reduction of post-surgical adhesions (fibrous bands that form between tissues and organs) under the trade name Adept.

== Chemistry ==
Icodextrin is a starch-derived, branched, water-soluble glucose polymer linked by α-(1→4) and less than 10% α-(1→6) glycosidic bonds, making it a type of dextrin. Its weight-average molecular weight is between 13,000 and 19,000 daltons and its number-average molecular weight between 5,000 and 6,500 daltons. The substance is a white to off-white solid, and the solution is clear and colourless to pale yellow.

== Mechanism of action ==
The osmotic activity of icodextrin keeps the solution inside the peritoneum for three to four days, separating tissues and thus reducing adhesion between them when fibrin is formed after a surgery. In other words, the tissues are kept from gluing together.

Peritoneal dialysis

When used for peritoneal dialysis, the icodextrin solution absorbs waste products from the blood, and is removed from the peritoneum after a few hours together with the waste.

== Pharmacokinetics ==
Icodextrin is not significantly metabolised inside the peritoneum. Instead, it is absorbed slowly (40% after 12 hours) into the bloodstream via the lymph vessels. There it is broken down into oligosaccharides by the enzyme alpha-amylase. In patients with intact kidney function, both icodextrin and its fragments are excreted via the kidney by glomerular filtration.

== Contraindications ==
Icodextrin is contraindicated in patients with cornstarch allergy, maltose or isomaltose intolerance, glycogen storage disease, or severe lactic acidosis.

== Adverse effects ==
Adverse effects include peritonitis, respiratory infection, hypertension (high blood pressure), rashes, and headache. Of these side effects, only hypertension and rashes occurred significantly more often than under glucose solution; the other events seem to be related to peritoneal dialysis in general.

== Interactions ==
Icodextrin can mimic increased blood glucose levels, depending on the used testing system. Specifically, glucose dehydrogenase pyrroloquinolinequinone (GDH-PQQ) or glucose-dye-oxidoreductase (GDO) based tests can erroneously show high blood glucose in patients that have been treated with icodextrin.
