= Peritoneal equilibration test =

Medical test

- Purpose: characteristics of the peritoneal membrane

In nephrology, the peritoneal equilibration test (PET), is a tool used by nephrologists to determine the characteristics of the peritoneal membrane mass transport characteristics, when assessing a patient for peritoneal dialysis.

== Definition ==
The peritoneal equilibration test (PET) is a semiquantitative assessment of peritoneal membrane transport function in patients on peritoneal dialysis (PD). The solute transport rates are assessed by the rates of their equilibration between the peritoneal capillary blood and dialysate. The ratio of solute concentrations in dialysate and plasma (D/P ratio) at specific times (t) during the dwell signifies the extent of solute equilibration. This ratio can be determined for any solute that is transported from the capillary blood to the dialysate. Creatinine, urea, electrolytes, phosphate, and proteins are the commonly tested solutes for clinical use.
