= Encapsulating peritoneal sclerosis =

Medical condition

- Specialty: Gastroenterology

Encapsulating peritoneal sclerosis (EPS) also known as sclerosing encapsulating peritonitis, is a rare but serious complication of long-term peritoneal dialysis in which progressive fibrotic thickening of the peritoneum can partially or completely encase the bowel, leading to recurrent or persistent bowel obstruction and malnutrition.

== Terminology ==
Terminology for this condition varies by specialty and etiology. Not to be confused with congenital peritoneal encapsulation, a rare developmental anomaly in which a thin accessory peritoneal membrane encloses all or part of the small bowel.. In nephrology, encapsulating peritoneal sclerosis is commonly used for the form associated with long-term peritoneal dialysis. In surgical and radiology literature, abdominal cocoon is often used for idiopathic cases of sclerosing encapsulating peritonitis, although terminology is inconsistent across publications.

== Signs and symptoms ==
Patients usually present with abdominal symptoms such as altered bowel habits, nausea, vomiting, anorexia, and early satiety. In the early stages, these symptoms can be linked to signs of inflammation such as pyrexia and elevated CRP, and/or blood-stained ascites.

Abdominal pain, fullness, overt bowel obstruction, and the presence of an abdominal mass are linked to the late stages of encapsulating peritoneal sclerosis. The intestines become gradually covered with a fibrous cocoon, which causes weight loss, malnutrition, bowel obstruction, ischemia and strangulation, infection, and death.

== Causes ==
Encapsulating peritoneal sclerosis is typically observed in patients with end-stage renal disease (ESRD) receiving long-term peritoneal dialysis therapy. Dialysis fluid's high glucose content and acidic pH cause harm to the peritoneum. High glucose concentrations promote osmosis and diffusion gradients across the peritoneum, while low pH inhibits the production of harmful glucose degradation products (GDPs). GDPs are created when peritoneal dialysis fluid is heated to sterilize it and these result in the production of advanced glycation end products (AGEs) when glucose is present. Less GDP-containing biocompatible solutions are now more frequently used, which lessens peritoneal damage.

Encapsulating peritoneal sclerosis can also occur in patients who are not on peritoneal dialysis but are suffering from other illnesses like endometriosis, sarcoidosis, peritoneal and intra-abdominal cancers, chronic peritoneal ascites, intraperitoneal chemotherapy, intraperitoneal exposure to particulate matter or disinfectant, abdominal surgery, intraperitoneal infections (tuberculosis), and beta-blocker administration.

=== Risk factors ===
The length of peritoneal dialysis treatment appears to be the primary risk factor for encapsulating peritoneal sclerosis development. The incidence of encapsulating peritoneal sclerosis rose with the length of peritoneal dialysis (PD) in an Australian survey; for patients on PD for more than 2, 5, 6, and 8 years, the rates were 1.9, 6.4, 10.8, and 19.4%, respectively.

Given that there is a high incidence of encapsulating peritoneal sclerosis shortly after renal transplantation, organ transplantation seems to increase the risk of developing this condition.

A frequent side effect of peritoneal dialysis, peritonitis is intricately linked to the development of encapsulating peritoneal sclerosis, with the frequency of episodes being correlated with the occurrence of encapsulating peritoneal sclerosis. Encapsulating peritoneal sclerosis has been specifically linked to recurrent peritonitis caused by bacterial contamination, specifically from Pseudomonas spp., Staphylococcus aureus, and specific fungal organisms.

=== Triggers ===
Implicated triggers include systemic rheumatologic and inflammatory disorders, dermoid cyst rupture, gynecologic neoplasms, endometriosis, organ transplantation, cirrhosis, mechanical or chemical intraperitoneal irritants, infection, and medications.

== Mechanism ==
Encapsulating peritoneal sclerosis is believed to happen in patients who have a predisposing condition if a peritoneal inflammatory process (inciting factor) takes place. This is known as the "two-hit" theory in the literature on peritoneal dialysis, according to which the non-inflammatory peritoneal sclerosis brought on by repeated dialysis treatments is the "first hit" or predisposing factor. This is corroborated by the fact that during peritoneal dialysis, the cumulative incidence of encapsulating peritoneal sclerosis rises significantly over time. A proinflammatory "second hit" initiates a series of proangiogenic [vascular endothelial growth factor (VEGF)], proinflammatory [transforming growth factor β1 (TGFβ1), interleukin-6 (IL-6), CCN2] cytokines. TGFβ1 stimulates peritoneal mesothelial cells to transdifferentiate into mesenchymal cells, which leads to the depletion of mesothelial cells, increased extracellular matrix component production [collagen type 1, alpha 1 (COL1A1)], and fibrogenesis, which forms a fibrocollagenous cocoon.

== Diagnosis ==
Encapsulating peritoneal sclerosis is diagnosed clinically, supported by radiography or laparotomy, and based on a constellation of clinical findings.

The non-specific laboratory results associated with encapsulating peritoneal sclerosis are linked to underlying infections, malnourishment, and inflammation. It has been demonstrated that dialysate from patients with encapsulating peritoneal sclerosis had higher levels of inflammatory cytokines than did peritoneal dialysis controls, sometimes up to years before the condition's clinical manifestation. Nevertheless, no biomarker has been discovered to help anticipate the onset of encapsulating peritoneal sclerosis.

When distinguishing encapsulating peritoneal sclerosis from other causes of intestinal obstruction, imaging is frequently useful. Advanced encapsulating peritoneal sclerosis may be suggested by abdominal plain films with peritoneal calcification and dilated bowel loops with air-fluid levels. The small bowel follow-through may be characterized by delayed transit, distension near small bowel adhesions, and a "cauliflower" appearance due to peritoneal sclerosis-encapsulated bowel loop compression. Dilated loops of bowel may appear encased in a dense fibrous membrane or matted together and tethered posteriorly on ultrasonography. The appearance of a trilaminar colon wall may be due to intraperitoneal echogenic strands.

As of right now, the most extensively researched and widely used imaging method for encapsulating peritoneal sclerosis diagnosis is the CT scan. Small bowel loops are frequently connected by a thickened, encircling peritoneum, which is usually accompanied by proximal bowel dilatation. Increased mesenteric fat density, loculated ascites, and localized or diffuse peritoneal calcification are additional radiographic features. Complex loculations may indicate intra-abdominal hemorrhage, but if they contain gas, there is reason to suspect sepsis or a perforation. Elevated thickening or enhancement of the colon wall suggests transmural fibrosis or persistent inflammation. Although it hasn't been used as much for diagnosis, magnetic resonance imaging probably produces similar results. Benefits include better bowel encasement and peritoneal thickening delineation, as well as the avoidance of ionizing radiation.

The histologic results for encapsulating peritoneal sclerosis are not specific and can be confused with those for infectious peritonitis or simple peritoneal sclerosis. The mesothelial cell layer is microscopically denuded by fibrin deposition, fibroblast proliferation, and fibrocollagenous deposition. When inflammation is active, there may be an infiltration of inflammatory mononuclear cells. Encapsulating peritoneal sclerosis is distinguished from peritoneal sclerosis and peritonitis by the transmembrane glycoprotein podoplanin, which is present on peritoneal mesothelial cells and binds inflammatory cytokines.

=== Classification ===
Based on the clinical presentation, encapsulating peritoneal sclerosis is classified into four stages:

1. Pre-encapsulating peritoneal sclerosis stage: Mild ascites, no inflammation, and no symptoms.
2. Inflammatory stage: The patient's symptoms, which include intestinal swelling and partial encapsulation of the bowel, nausea and diarrhea. There is an exudation of fibrin and mild inflammation.
3. Encapsulation: Signs of intestinal blockage brought on by the encapsulation-causing fibrous cocoon. It may be linked to inflammation, ranging from mild to severe.
4. Chronic stage of ileus: The thickening of the encapsulating fibrous cocoon causes patients to experience complete bowel obstruction. At this point, there's not much, if any, inflammation.

== Prevention ==
There is currently no known way to stop encapsulating peritoneal sclerosis from developing, despite numerous studies pointing to potential causes. There has been much discussion regarding the "expiry date" for patients receiving peritoneal dialysis because the risk of developing encapsulating peritoneal sclerosis rises with the length of the treatment. Research from Japan has indicated that patients should switch to hemodialysis after the recommended 8-year safe period for continuing peritoneal dialysis. Setting an expiration date, however, is not advised since it may worsen quality of life and raise the risk of complications for patients receiving hemodialysis via tunneled lines in cases where they had no symptoms while receiving peritoneal dialysis.

== Treatment ==
Treating the underlying cause of encapsulating peritoneal sclerosis is recommended whenever it is feasible. This entails switching from peritoneal dialysis to hemodialysis in the case of peritoneal dialysis.

The nutritional status should be evaluated upon encapsulating peritoneal sclerosis diagnosis. Encapsulating peritoneal sclerosis cannot be effectively treated with bowel rest or total parenteral nutrition (TPN) alone; however, making sure the patient receives enough nutrition is crucial. Enteral feeding is frequently not tolerated due to obstruction, necessitating TPN.

Many medications have been used to target the inflammatory component of encapsulating peritoneal sclerosis such as mammalian target of rapamycin (mTOR) inhibitors, cyclosporine, mycophenolate mofetil, colchicine, corticosteroids, and azathioprine.

For patients who have already experienced significant fibrosis, immunosuppression might not be enough. A potent anti-fibrotic agent, tamoxifen is a selective estrogen receptor modulator (SERM) that inhibits TGF-β, a crucial cytokine in the fibrosis process.

Because encapsulating peritoneal sclerosis surgery is a time-consuming, dangerous, and technical procedure, it should only be performed on patients who have not responded to conservative medical therapy and, if at all possible, in facilities with prior experience performing such procedures.

== Outlook ==
Patients with encapsulating peritoneal sclerosis have a very high death rate, which ranges from 26% to 58%, and rises with the length of peritoneal dialysis. Malnutrition and sepsis are the most common causes of death among those with encapsulating peritoneal sclerosis.

== Epidemiology ==
Encapsulating peritoneal sclerosis occurs between 0.5% and 7.3% of the time worldwide, but in patients receiving peritoneal dialysis for 15 years or longer, the frequency can reach 17.2%. After nine years of peritoneal dialysis, the encapsulating peritoneal sclerosis risk rose to 8% in one study involving over 17,300 patients from Australia, New Zealand, and Scotland; however, when the competing risk of death was considered, the risk dropped to just 1.5%.

== See also ==
- Peritonitis
- Peritoneal dialysis
