= Laparoscopy =

Minimally invasive operation within the abdominal or pelvic cavities

- Illustration of laparoscopy
- Specialty: Obstetrics (historically)
- ICD-9-CM: 54.21
- MeSH: D010535
- OPS-301 code: 1-694

Laparoscopy (from Ancient Greek λαπάρα (lapára) 'flank, side' and σκοπέω (skopéō) 'to see') is an operation performed in the abdomen or pelvis using small incisions (usually 0.5–1.5 cm) with the aid of a camera. The laparoscope aids diagnosis or therapeutic interventions with a few small cuts in the abdomen.

Laparoscopic surgery, also called minimally invasive procedure, bandaid surgery, or keyhole surgery, is a modern surgical technique. There are a number of advantages to the patient with laparoscopic surgery versus an exploratory laparotomy. These include reduced pain due to smaller incisions, reduced hemorrhaging, and shorter recovery time. The key element is the use of a laparoscope, a long fiber optic cable system that allows viewing of the affected area by snaking the cable from a more distant, but more easily accessible location.

Laparoscopic surgery includes operations within the abdominal or pelvic cavities, whereas keyhole surgery performed on the thoracic or chest cavity is called thoracoscopic surgery. Specific surgical instruments used in laparoscopic surgery include obstetrical forceps, scissors, probes, dissectors, hooks, and retractors. Laparoscopic and thoracoscopic surgery belong to the broader field of endoscopy. The first laparoscopic procedure was performed by German surgeon Georg Kelling in 1901.

== Types of laparoscopes ==
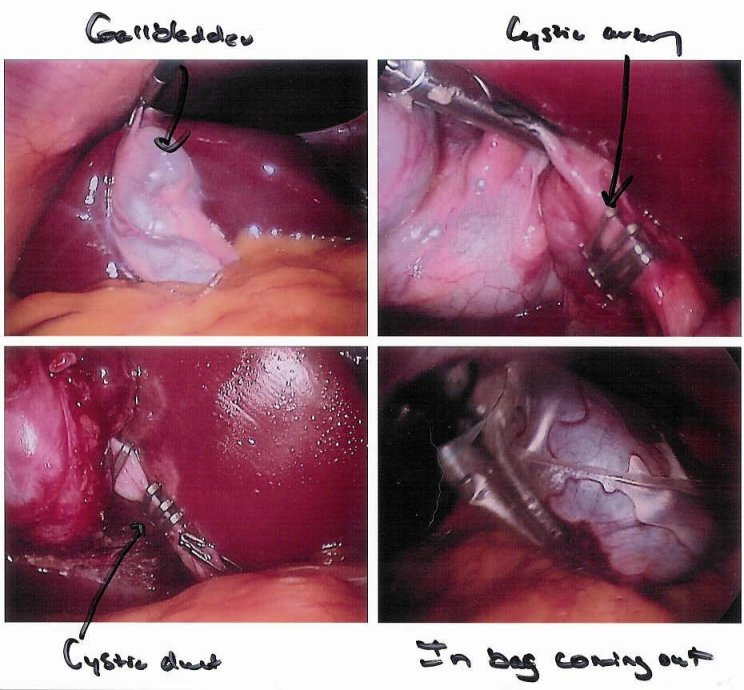
Cholecystectomy as seen through a laparoscope. Clockwise from the top left, the text reads: 'Gallbladder', 'Cystic artery', 'In bag coming out,' and Cystic duct.

There are two types of laparoscope:

1. A telescopic rod lens system, usually connected to a video camera (single-chip CCD or three-chip CCD)
2. A digital laparoscope where a miniature digital video camera is placed at the end of the laparoscope, eliminating the rod lens system

The mechanism mentioned in the second type is mainly used to improve the image quality of flexible endoscopes, replacing conventional fiberscopes. Nevertheless, laparoscopes are rigid endoscopes. Rigidity is required in clinical practice. The rod-lens-based laparoscopes dominate overwhelmingly in practice, due to their fine optical resolution (50 μm typically, dependent on the aperture size used in the objective lens), and the image quality can be better than that of the digital camera if necessary. The second type of laparoscope is very rare in the laparoscope market and in hospitals.

Also attached is a fiber optic cable system connected to a "cold" light source (halogen or xenon) to illuminate the operative field, which is inserted through a 5 mm or 10 mm cannula or trocar. The abdomen is usually insufflated with carbon dioxide gas as the safety, harms, and benefits of other gasses (e.g., helium, argon, nitrogen, nitrous oxide, and room air) is uncertain. This elevates the abdominal wall above the internal organs to create a working and viewing space. CO_{2} is used because it is common to the human body and can be absorbed by tissue and removed by the respiratory system. It is also non-flammable, which is important because electrosurgical devices are commonly used in laparoscopic procedures.

== Procedures ==
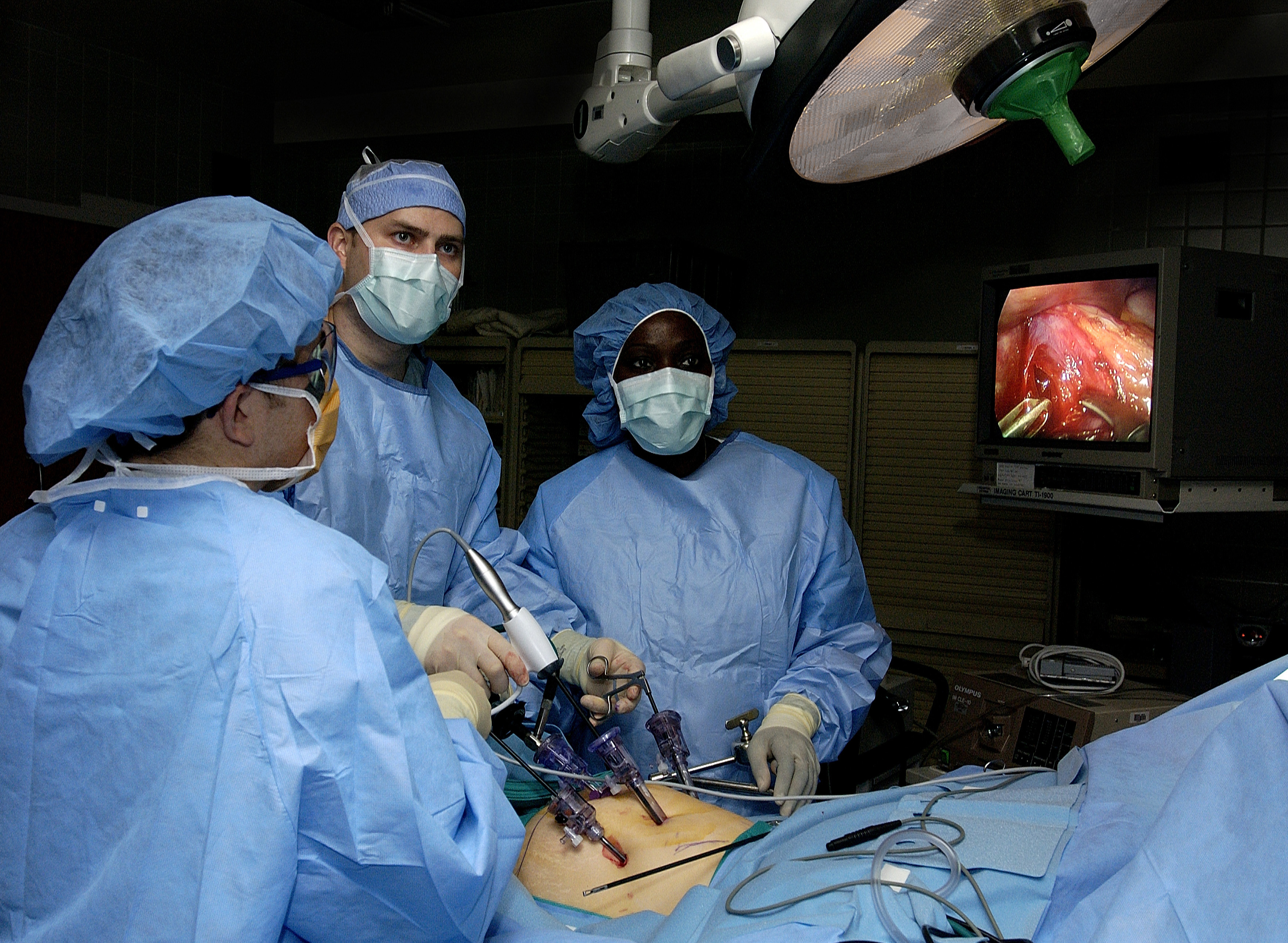
Surgeons perform laparoscopic stomach surgery.

=== Patient position ===
During the laparoscopic procedure, the position of the patient is either in Trendelenburg position or in reverse Trendelenburg. These positions have an effect on cardiopulmonary function. In Trendelenburg's position, there is an increased preload due to an increase in the venous return from lower extremities. This position results in cephalic shifting of the viscera, which accentuates the pressure on the diaphragm. In the case of reverse Trendelenburg position, pulmonary function tends to improve as there is a caudal shifting of viscera, which improves tidal volume by a decrease in the pressure on the diaphragm. This position also decreases the preload on the heart and causes a decrease in the venous return leading to hypotension. The pooling of blood in the lower extremities increases the stasis and predisposes the patient to develop deep vein thrombosis (DVT).

=== Gallbladder ===
Rather than a minimum 20 cm incision as in traditional (open) cholecystectomy, four incisions of 0.5–1.0 cm, or, beginning in the second decade of the 21st century, a single incision of 1.5–2.0 cm, will be sufficient to perform a laparoscopic removal of a gallbladder. Since the gallbladder is similar to a small balloon that stores and releases bile, it can usually be removed from the abdomen by suctioning out the bile and then removing the deflated gallbladder through the 1 cm incision at the patient's navel. The length of postoperative stay in the hospital is minimal, and most patients can be safely discharged from the hospital the same day.

=== Colon and kidney ===
In certain advanced laparoscopic procedures, where the specimen removed is too large to pull through a trocar site (as is done with gallbladders), an incision larger than 10 mm must be made. The most common of these procedures are removal of all or part of the colon (colectomy), or removal of the kidney (nephrectomy). Some surgeons perform these procedures completely laparoscopically, making the larger incision toward the end of the procedure for specimen removal, or, in the case of a colectomy, to also prepare the remaining healthy bowel to be reconnected (create an anastomosis). Many other surgeons feel that since they will have to make a larger incision for specimen removal anyway, they might as well use this incision to have their hand in the operative field during the procedure to aid as a retractor, dissector, and to be able to feel differing tissue densities (palpate), as they would in open surgery. This technique is called hand-assist laparoscopy. Since they will still be working with scopes and other laparoscopic instruments, CO_{2} will have to be maintained in the patient's abdomen, so a device known as a hand access port (a sleeve with a seal that allows passage of the hand) must be used. Surgeons who choose this hand-assist technique feel it reduces operative time significantly versus the straight laparoscopic approach. It also gives them more options in dealing with unexpected adverse events (e.g., uncontrolled bleeding) that may otherwise require creating a much larger incision and converting to a fully open surgical procedure.

Conceptually, the laparoscopic approach is intended to minimise post-operative pain and speed up recovery times, while maintaining an enhanced visual field for surgeons. Due to improved patient outcomes in the early 21st century, laparoscopic surgery has been adopted by various surgical sub-specialties, including gastrointestinal surgery (including bariatric procedures for morbid obesity), gynecologic surgery, and urology. Based on numerous prospective randomized controlled trials, the approach has proven to be beneficial in reducing post-operative morbidities such as wound infections and incisional hernias (especially in morbidly obese patients), and is now deemed safe when applied to surgery for cancers such as cancer of colon.

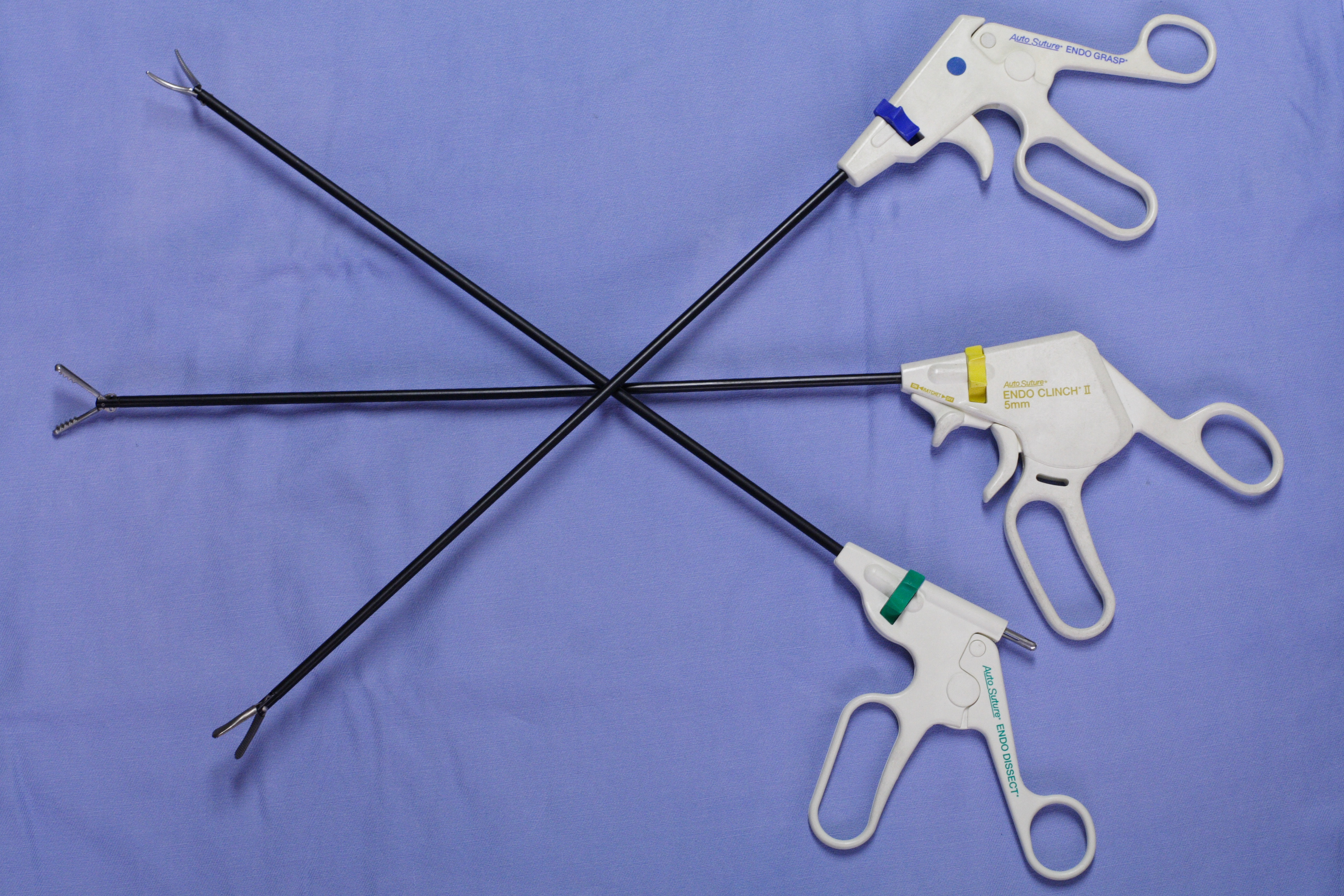
Laparoscopic instruments

The restricted vision, the difficulty in handling of the instruments (new hand-eye coordination skills are needed), the lack of tactile perception, and the limited working area are factors adding to the technical complexity of this surgical approach. For these reasons, minimally invasive surgery has emerged as a highly competitive new sub-specialty within various fields of surgery. Surgical residents who wish to focus on this area of surgery gain additional laparoscopic surgery training during one or two years of fellowship after completing their basic surgical residency. In OB-GYN residency programs, the average laparoscopy-to-laparotomy quotient (LPQ) is 0.55.

=== In veterinary medicine ===
Laparoscopic techniques have also been developed in the field of veterinary medicine. Due to the relatively high cost of the equipment required, it has not become commonplace in most traditional practices today but rather limited to specialty practices. Many of the same surgeries performed in humans can be applied to animal cases – everything from an egg-bound tortoise to a German Shepherd can benefit from MIS. A paper published in JAVMA (Journal of the American Veterinary Medical Association) in 2005 showed that dogs spayed laparoscopically experienced significantly less pain (65%) than those that were spayed with traditional "open" methods. Arthroscopy, thoracoscopy, and cystoscopy are all performed in veterinary medicine today.

=== Advantages ===
There are a number of advantages to the patient with laparoscopic surgery versus an open procedure. These include:

- Reduced hemorrhaging, which reduces the chance of needing a blood transfusion.
- Smaller incision, which reduces pain and shortens recovery time, as well as resulting in less post-operative scarring.
- Less pain, leading to less pain medication needed.
- Use of regional anesthesia (with the recommendation of using a combined spinal and epidural anaesthesia) for laparoscopic surgery, as opposed to general anesthesia required for many non-laparoscopic procedures, can produce fewer complications and quicker recovery.
- Although procedure times are usually slightly longer, hospital stay is less, and often with a same day discharge which leads to a faster return to everyday living.
- Reduced exposure of internal organs to possible external contaminants, thereby reduced risk of acquiring infections.

Although laparoscopy in adults is widely accepted, its advantages in children are questioned. Benefits of laparoscopy appear to recede with younger age. Efficacy of laparoscopy is inferior to open surgery in certain conditions such as pyloromyotomy for infantile hypertrophic pyloric stenosis. Although laparoscopic appendectomy has less wound problems than open surgery, the former is associated with more intra-abdominal abscesses.

=== Disadvantages ===
While laparoscopic surgery is clearly advantageous in terms of patient outcomes, the procedure is more difficult from the surgeon's perspective when compared to conventional, open surgery:

- Laparoscopic surgery requires pneumoperitoneum for adequate visualization and operative manipulation.
- The surgeon has a limited range of motion at the surgical site, resulting in a loss of dexterity.
- Poor depth perception.
- Surgeons must use tools to interact with tissue rather than manipulate it directly with their hands. This results in an inability to accurately judge how much force is applied to tissue and higher risk of damaging tissue by applying more force than necessary. This limitation also reduces tactile sensation, making it more difficult for the surgeon to feel tissue (sometimes an important diagnostic tool, such as when palpating for tumors) and making delicate operations such as tying sutures more difficult.
- The tool endpoints move in the opposite direction to the surgeon's hands due to the pivot point, making laparoscopic surgery a non-intuitive motor skill that is difficult to learn. This is called the fulcrum effect.
- Some surgeries (carpal tunnel for instance) generally turn out better for the patient when the area can be opened up, allowing the surgeon to see the surrounding physiology, to better address the issue at hand. In this regard, keyhole surgery can be a disadvantage.

== Risks ==
Some of the risks are briefly described below:

- The major problems during laparoscopic surgery are related to the cardiopulmonary effect of pneumoperitoneum, systemic carbon dioxide absorption, venous gas embolism, unintentional injuries to intra-abdominal structures and patient positioning.
- The most significant risks are from trocar injuries during insertion into the abdominal cavity, as the trocar is typically inserted blindly. Injuries include abdominal wall hematoma, umbilical hernias, umbilical wound infection, and penetration of blood vessels or small or large bowel. The risk of such injuries is increased in patients who have a low body mass index or have a history of prior abdominal surgery. While these injuries are rare, significant complications can occur, and they are primarily related to the umbilical insertion site. Vascular injuries can result in hemorrhage that may be life-threatening. Injuries to the bowel can cause a delayed peritonitis. It is very important that these injuries be recognized as early as possible.
- In oncologic laparoscopic procedures there is a risk of port site metastases, especially in patients with peritoneal carcinomatosis. This incidence of iatrogenic dissemination of cancer might be reduced with special measures as trocar site protection and midline placement of trocars.
- Some patients have sustained electrical burns unseen by surgeons who are working with electrodes that leak current into surrounding tissue. The resulting injuries can result in perforated organs and can also lead to peritonitis.
- About 20% of patients undergo hypothermia during surgery and peritoneal trauma due to increased exposure to cold, dry gases during insufflation. The use of surgical humidification therapy, which is the use of heated and humidified CO_{2} for insufflation, has been shown to reduce this risk.
- Not all of the CO_{2} introduced into the abdominal cavity is removed through the incisions during surgery. Gas tends to rise, and when a pocket of CO_{2} rises in the abdomen, it pushes against the diaphragm (the muscle that separates the abdominal from the thoracic cavities and facilitates breathing), and can exert pressure on the phrenic nerve. This produces a sensation of pain that may extend to the patient's shoulders in about 80% of women for example. In all cases, the pain is transient, as the body tissues will absorb the CO_{2} and eliminate it through respiration.
- Coagulation disorders and dense adhesions (scar tissue) from previous abdominal surgery may pose added risk for laparoscopic surgery and are considered relative contra-indications for this approach.
- Intra-abdominal adhesion formation is a risk associated with both laparoscopic and open surgery and remains a significant, unresolved problem. Adhesions are fibrous deposits that connect tissue to organ post surgery. Generally, they occur in 50-100% of all abdominal surgeries, with the risk of developing adhesions the same for both procedures. Complications of adhesions include chronic pelvic pain, bowel obstruction, and female infertility. In particular, small bowel obstruction poses the most significant problem. The use of surgical humidification therapy during laparoscopic surgery may minimise the incidence of adhesion formation. Other techniques to reduce adhesion formation include the use of physical barriers such as films or gels, or broad-coverage fluid agents to separate tissues during healing following surgery.
- The gas used to make space and the smoke generated during surgical procedures can leak into the operating room through or around access devices as well as instruments. The gas plume can pollute the airspace shared by the operating team and patient with particles and potentially pathogens, including viral particles.

== Robotic laparoscopic surgery ==
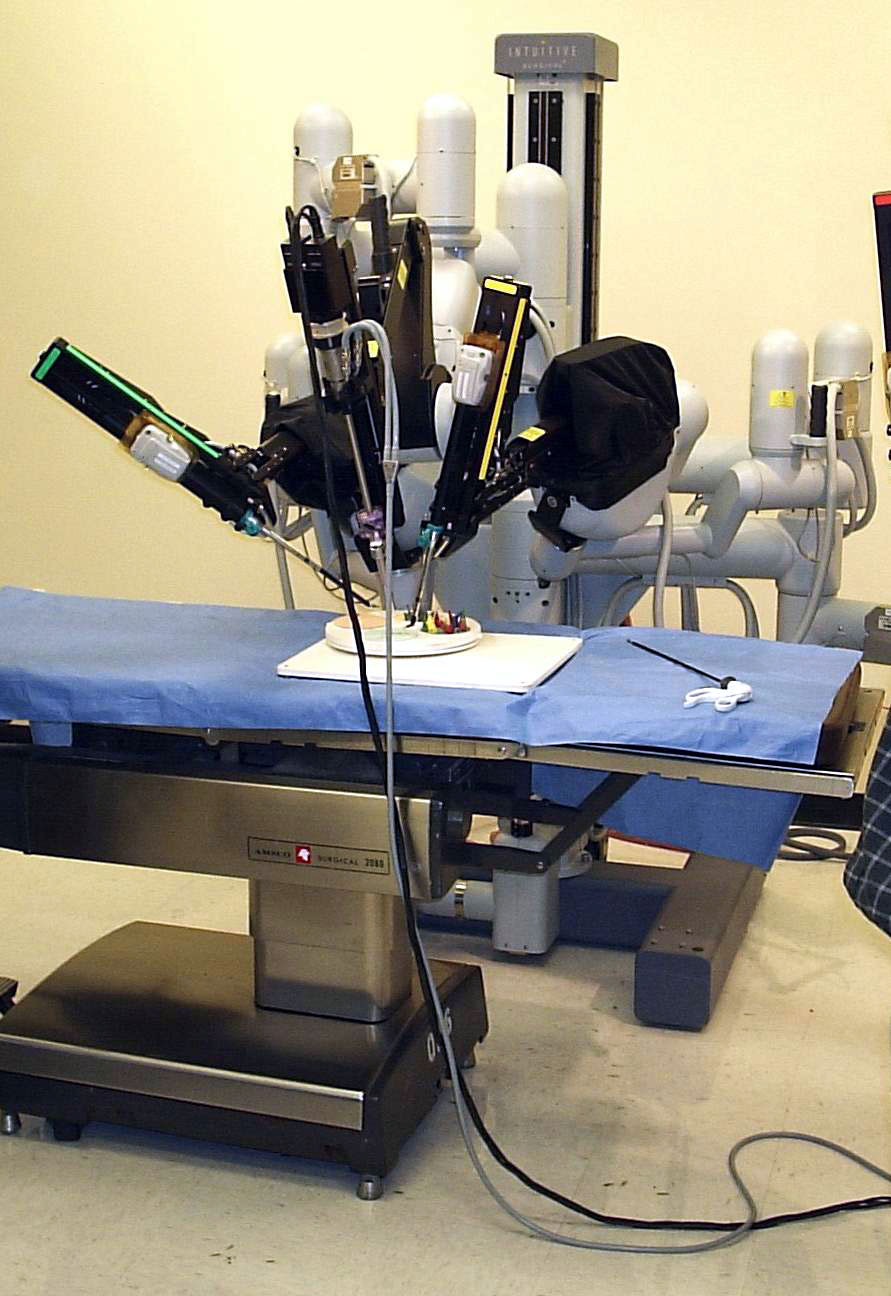
A laparoscopic robotic surgery machine

In recent years, electronic tools have been developed to aid surgeons. Some of the features include:

- Visual magnification — use of a large viewing screen improves visibility
- Stabilization — Electromechanical damping of vibrations, due to machinery or shaky human hands
- Simulators — use of specialized virtual reality training tools to improve physicians' proficiency in surgery
- Reduced number of incisions

Robotic surgery has been touted as a solution to underdeveloped nations, whereby a single central hospital can operate several remote machines at distant locations. The potential for robotic surgery has had a strong military interest as well, with the intention of providing mobile medical care while keeping trained doctors safe from battle.

In January 2022, a robot performed the first ever successful laparoscopic surgery without the help of a human. The robot performed the surgery on the soft tissue of a pig. It succeeded at intestinal anastomosis, a procedure that involves connecting two ends of an intestine. The robot, named the Smart Tissue Autonomous Robot (STAR), was designed by a team of Johns Hopkins University researchers.

== Non-robotic hand-guided assistance systems ==
There are also user-friendly nonrobotic assistance systems that are single-hand guided devices with a high potential to save time and money. These assistance devices are not bound by the restrictions of common medical robotic systems. The systems enhance the manual possibilities of the surgeon and his/her team, regarding the need of replacing static holding force during the intervention.

With laparoscopy providing tissue diagnosis and helping to achieve the final diagnosis without any significant complication and less operative time, it can be safely concluded that diagnostic laparoscopy is a safe, quick, and effective adjunct to non‑surgical diagnostic modalities, for establishing a conclusive diagnosis, but whether it will replace imaging studies as a primary modality for diagnosis needs more evidence.

== History ==
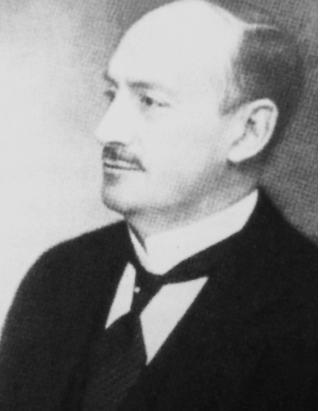
Hans Christian Jacobaeus

It is difficult to credit one individual with the pioneering of the laparoscopic approach. In 1901, Georg Kelling of Dresden, Germany, performed the first laparoscopic procedure in dogs, and, in 1910, Hans Christian Jacobaeus of Sweden performed the first laparoscopic operation in humans.

In the ensuing several decades, numerous individuals refined and popularized the approach further for laparoscopy. The advent of computer chip-based television cameras was a seminal event in the field of laparoscopy. This technological innovation provided the means to project a magnified view of the operative field onto a monitor and, at the same time, freed both the operating surgeon's hands, thereby facilitating performance of complex laparoscopic procedures.

The first publication on modern diagnostic laparoscopy by Raoul Palmer appeared in 1947, followed by the publication of Hans Frangenheim and Kurt Semm, who both practised CO_{2} hysteroscopy from the mid-1970s.

Patrick Steptoe, one of the pioneers of IVF, was important in popularizing laparoscopy in the UK. He published a textbook, Laparoscopy in Gynaecology, in 1967.

In 1972, H. Courtenay Clarke invented, published, patented, presented, and recorded on film laparoscopic surgery, with instruments he invented and were marketed by the Ven Instrument Company of Buffalo, New York. He was the first to perform a surgical laparoscopic process with standard sutures and simple instruments. This was meant to facilitate the application of laparoscopic surgery to all economic sectors by avoiding expensive materials and devices.

In 1975, Tarasconi, from the Department of Ob-Gyn of the University of Passo Fundo Medical School (Passo Fundo, RS, Brazil), started his experience with organ resection by laparoscopy (Salpingectomy), first reported in the Third AAGL Meeting, Hyatt Regency Atlanta, November 1976 and later published in The Journal of Reproductive Medicine in 1981. This laparoscopic surgical procedure was the first laparoscopic organ resection reported in medical literature.

In 1981, Semm, from the gynecological clinic of Kiel University, Germany, performed the first laparoscopic appendectomy. Following his lecture on laparoscopic appendectomy, the president of the German Surgical Society wrote to the Board of Directors of the German Gynecological Society suggesting suspension of Semm from medical practice. Subsequently, Semm submitted a paper on laparoscopic appendectomy to the American Journal of Obstetrics and Gynecology, at first rejected as unacceptable for publication on the grounds that the technique reported on was "unethical," but finally published in the journal Endoscopy. The abstract of his paper on endoscopic appendectomy can be found at the journal site.

Semm established several standard procedures that were regularly performed, such as ovarian cyst enucleation, myomectomy, treatment of ectopic pregnancy and finally laparoscopic-assisted vaginal hysterectomy (also termed cervical intra-fascial Semm hysterectomy). He also developed a medical instrument company Wisap in Munich, Germany, which still produces various endoscopic instruments. In 1985, he constructed the pelvi-trainer = laparo-trainer, a practical surgical model whereby colleagues could practice laparoscopic techniques. Semm published over 1000 papers in various journals. He also produced over 30 endoscopic films and more than 20,000 colored slides to teach and inform interested colleagues about his technique. His first atlas, More Details on Pelviscopy and Hysteroscopy was published in 1976, a slide atlas on pelviscopy, hysteroscopy, and fetoscopy in 1979, and his books on gynecological endoscopic surgery in German, English, and many other languages in 1984, 1987, and 2002.

In 1985, Erich Mühe, professor of surgery in Germany, performed the first laparoscopic cholecystectomy. Afterward, laparoscopy gained rapid acceptance for non-gynecologic applications. The first video-assisted laparoscopic surgery was performed in 1987, a laparoscopic cholecystectomy. Before this time, the operating field was visualised by surgeons directly via a laparoscope.

In 1987, Alfred Cuschieri performed the first minimally invasive surgery in the UK with his team at Ninewells Hospital after working with multiple researchers from across the world, including Patrick Steptoe. Cuschieri took advantage of smaller cameras to perform operations with smaller cuts and shorter recovery times. After some controversy and patient deaths, new laparoscopic training centres were set up as most surgeons lacked the necessary specialised training to perform laparoscopic surgery. The first opened in Dundee in 1991 and became the Cuschieri Skills Centre at Ninewells Hospital in 2004. As of 2008, 40 specialist centres around the world base their laparoscopic training on the Cuschieri Skills Centre.

Prior to Mühe, the only specialty performing laparoscopy on a widespread basis was gynecology, mostly for relatively short, simple procedures such as a diagnostic laparoscopy or tubal ligation. The introduction in 1990 of a laparoscopic clip applier with twenty automatically advancing clips (rather than a single load clip applier that would have to be taken out, reloaded and reintroduced for each clip application) made general surgeons more comfortable with making the leap to laparoscopic cholecystectomies ( gall bladder removal). On the other hand, some surgeons continue to use the single clip appliers as they save as much as $200 per case for the patient, detract nothing from the quality of the clip ligation, and add only seconds to case lengths. Both laparoscopy tubal ligations and cholecystectomies may be performed using suturing and tying, thus further reducing the expensive cost of single and multiclips (when compared to suture). Once again this may increase case lengths but costs are greatly reduced (ideal for developing countries) and widespread accidents of loose clips are eliminated.

The first transatlantic surgery performed was a laparoscopic gallbladder removal in 2001. The first robotic advanced pediatric surgery series were performed overseas in Egypt at Cairo University. Remote surgeries and robotic surgeries have since become more common and are typically laparoscopic procedures.

== Gynecological diagnosis ==
In gynecology, diagnostic laparoscopy may be used to inspect the outside of the uterus, ovaries, and fallopian tubes, as, for example, in the diagnosis of female infertility. Usually, one incision is placed near the navel and a second near the pubic hairline. A special type of laparoscope called a fertiloscope, which is modified for transvaginal application, can be used. A dye test may be performed to detect any blockage in the reproductive tract, wherein a dark blue dye is passed up through the cervix and is followed with the laparoscope through its passage out into the fallopian tubes to the ovaries.

Laparoscopy is considered the "golden standard" for the diagnosis of endometriosis, although there have been recent developments in the use of imaging, primarily MRI, in the diagnostic process. When endometriosis is confirmed during diagnostic laparoscopy, the surgery will then also often involve treatment through the removal of endometrial tissue. Samples are sometimes collected for biopsy.

== See also ==
- Arthroscopic surgery – Examination of a joint via small surgical incision
- Invasiveness of surgical procedures – Surgical technique that limits size of surgical incisions needed
- Laparotomy – Surgical procedure to open the abdominal cavity
- Minimally invasive procedure
- Natural orifice translumenal endoscopic surgery
- Percutaneous – Type of surgical procedure
- Revision weight loss surgery – Type of bariatric surgery
- Single port laparoscopy
