= Anovulatory cycle =

Type of menstrual cycle

An anovulatory cycle is a menstrual cycle characterised by the absence of ovulation and a luteal phase. It may also vary in duration from a regular menstrual cycle.

== Patterns ==
While the normal human menstrual cycle typically lasts 4 weeks (28 days, range 24–35 days) and consists of a follicular phase, ovulation, and a luteal phase followed by either menstruation or pregnancy, the anovulatory cycle has cycle lengths of varying degrees. In many circumstances, menstrual intervals are prolonged, reaching 35–180 days (oligomenorrhea) or even longer (amenorrhea). In other cases, menstruation may be fairly regular (eumenorrhea), more frequent (intervals of less than 21 days) or there may be a loss of menstrual pattern (menorrhagia, dysfunctional uterine bleeding).

== Estrogen breakthrough bleeding ==
Normal menstrual bleeding in the ovulatory cycle is a result of a decline in progesterone due to the demise of the corpus luteum. It is thus a progesterone withdrawal bleed. As there is no progesterone in the anovulatory cycle, bleeding is caused by the inability of estrogen—which needs to be present to stimulate the endometrium in the first place—to support a growing endometrium. Anovulatory bleeding is hence termed 'estrogen breakthrough bleeding'.

== Risks ==
1. Anemia
2. Bone density loss
3. Endometrial cancer
4. Infertility

== Diagnosis ==
A physician needs to investigate the cause of anovulation. Common causes are:

1. Polyendocrine metabolic ovarian syndrome (PMOS)
2. Hypothalamic dysfunction
3. Perimenopause
4. Ovulatory dysfunction
5. Thyroid disorders
6. Hyperprolactinemia
7. Eating disorders, dieting or other disordered eating
8. Female athlete triad

With excessive or prolonged bleeding the diagnosis has to be made by a physician on a speedy basis. Other causes of gynecological bleeding need to be excluded, specifically bleeding related to pregnancy, leiomyoma, and cancer of the cervix or uterus.

== Management ==
Women who do not ovulate and who want to get pregnant need a medical work-up to find out why they do not ovulate. Drugs are often given to induce ovulation, including oral medication such as clomiphene or injectable medications. In patients who do not want to get pregnant anovulation can be managed with the use of cyclic progesterone or progestin supplementation or use of hormonal contraception.

== See also ==
- Anovulation
- Menstrual cycle
- Ovulation
