= Functional hypothalamic amenorrhea =

Form of amenorrhea and chronic anovulation

- Other names: Functional hypothalamic amenorrhoea, juvenile hypothalamosis syndrome
- Specialty: Gynaecology, endocrinology

Functional hypothalamic amenorrhea (FHA) is a form of amenorrhea and chronic anovulation and is one of the most common types of secondary amenorrhea. It is classified as hypogonadotropic hypogonadism.

It was previously known as "juvenile hypothalamosis syndrome," prior to the discovery that sexually mature females are equally affected. FHA has multiple risk factors, including stress-related, weight-related, and exercise-related factors. FHA is caused by stress-induced suppression of the hypothalamic-pituitary-ovarian (HPO) axis, which results in inhibition of gonadotropin-releasing hormone (GnRH) secretion, and gonadotropins, follicle-stimulating hormone (FSH), and luteinizing hormone (LH).

Severe and potentially prolonged hypoestrogenism is perhaps the most dangerous hormonal pathology associated with the disease, because consequences of this disturbance can influence bone health, cardiovascular health, mental health, and metabolic functioning in both the short and long-term. Because many of the symptoms overlap with those of organic hypothalamic, pituitary, or gonadal disease and therefore must be ruled out, FHA is a diagnosis of exclusion.

"Functional" is used to indicate a behavioral cause, in which no anatomical or organic disease is identified, and which is reversible with correction of the underlying cause. Diagnostic workup includes a detailed history and physical; laboratory studies, such as a pregnancy test and serum levels of FSH and LH, prolactin, and thyroid-stimulating hormone (TSH); and imaging. Additional tests may be indicated in order to distinguish FHA from organic hypothalamic or pituitary disorders. Patients present with a broad range of symptoms related to severe hypoestrogenism (including cardiovascular and skeletal irregularities) as well as hypercortisolemia, low serum insulin levels, low serum insulin-like growth factor 1 (IGF-1), and low total triiodothyronine (T3).

Treatment is primarily managing the primary cause of the FHA with behavioral modifications. While hormonal-based therapies can potentially restore menses, weight gain and behavioral modifications can have an even more potent impact on reversing neuroendocrine abnormalities, preventing further bone loss, and re-establishing menses, making this the recommended line of treatment. If this fails to work, secondary treatment is aimed at treating the effects of hypoestrogenism, hypercortisolism, and hypothyroidism.

== Presentation ==
FHA can be caused by chronic stress, whether it be from psychosocial, emotional or mental factors, weight-related factors, or exercise-induced factors. As such, the clinical manifestations of the disorder are the result of this chronic stress caused by the above three factors. The "classic" description was previously a "thin woman who undereats and overexercises," but recent studies are finding FHA can also present as a "high-achieving individual" with poor stress-management behaviors that include under- or over-eating and overexercising. It therefore follows that there may also be symptoms of the female athlete triad, eating disorders, low bone density, or osteoporosis. Some may willingly consume insufficient calories in conjunction with, or independent of, an underlying eating disorder, meaning that women with FHA may be normal weight or underweight. In amenorrheic athletes who have a near-normal weight, menses may be restored during periods of decreased training. The fact that nutritional restoration is insufficient for restoring menses in some women highlights the influence that psychological issues, including mood disorders and obsessive patterns of behavior such as hyper-exercise and/or restrictive eating behavior, impart on the etiology of FHA.

The disease can present in a variety of ways in both adolescents and adult women. Patients may present with subclinical menstrual dysfunction, ovulatory amenorrhea, amenorrhea, or have a history of combination of these disturbances. In most cases, there is a gradual loss of ovulation and menses demonstrated as the diseases manifests, followed by the eventual cessation of menstrual cycles altogether. According to the American Academy of Pediatrics and the American College of Obstetricians and Gynecologists, menstrual status should be considered a “vital sign” for all routine clinical visits because of the known effects of hypoestrogenism on bone and tissue health.

=== Reproductive ===
FHA can have long and short term consequences in a patient's reproductive development and fertility. Anovulation and amenorrhea is the characteristic feature of FHA. If hypoestrogenism and impaired HPO axis occurs during puberty, primary amenorrhea occurs. If the impairment occurs after puberty, secondary amenorrhea occurs, which is more common.

On a physical exam, FHA presents with delayed development, with patients halted in the secondary and tertiary sex characteristics of the pubertal stage before they developed FHA. The severity of the symptoms depends on the duration and severity of hypoestrogenism.

In adolescents, FHA presents with delayed menarche and non-specific development of pubertal stages, and underdevelopment of secondary and tertiary sex characteristics. In adult women, FHA can lead to atrophic changes, such as lack of cervical mucus, thinning of vaginal epithelium, and uterine muscle atrophy (hypoplasia), which can lead to painful intercourse (dyspareunia).

Because anovulation is a characteristic feature, patients often suffer from infertility. When diagnosing individuals with FHA, it is important take prior menstrual disorders into consideration. Patients with a history of, or who currently have, FHA and become pregnant require extra care and monitoring during pregnancy to avoid the increased risks of inadequate weight gain, intrauterine fetal growth restrictions, miscarriage, and/or preterm labor.

=== Bone ===
Decreased fat tissue mass and imbalances between bodyweight, fat tissue mass, and lean body mass has been linked to reduced BMD in FHA patients; however, absolute bone strength has not always been found to be affected. The majority of people reach their peak bone mass (PBM) around 30 years of age; however, 40-50% of that mass is formed during puberty. When FHA occurs in adolescence, inability to reach PBM becomes a primary concern, as 40-60% of factors contributing to PBM are of hormonal and nutritional influence. Estrogens, androgens, GH, and IGF-1 are the main determinants of PBM formation. In women, estrogens are the main component in proper bone formation. Through the stimulation of growth factors such as transforming growth factor beta (TGF-B), bone morphogenetic protein 6 (6-BMP-6), and IGF-1 and inhibition of receptor activator of nuclear factor kappa-B ligand (RANKL), estrogen tends to suppress bone resorption and activate bone formation and remodeling units. Because FHA causes hypoestrogenism, women with FHA may lack age-appropriate bone density and have an increased risk of skeletal fragility, stress fractures, osteopenia, and osteoporosis. The profile of low serum IGF-1, low serum insulin, and high serum cortisol also contribute to low BMD. Adiponectin has also been found to regulate the activity of osteoblasts and osteoclasts, possibly providing a link between the abnormal concentrations found in FHA patients with altered bone metabolism. Additionally, women with FHA may have improper diets or malnutrition, leading to low calcium and vitamin D intake, and may have a tendency to overexercise, which further increases the risk for osteopenia. This improper dieting and tendency to overexercise, leading to low bone density, is also seen in RED-S. Unlike in males diagnosed with RED-S, females are at an increased risk for the consequences of decreased bone density, since females have a PBM 25-30% lower than males. Although this decreased bone density is also seen in anorexia nervosa, the severity of peak bone density loss is less in FHA patients.

=== Cardiovascular ===
Cardiovascular disease (CVD) is the leading cause of death in women in developed countries, and it is well studied that hypoestrogenism has many regulatory functions in the cardiovascular system. Estradiol (E2), an estrogen steroid hormone and the major female sex hormone, has a cardio-protective effect. As such, hypoestrogenism caused by FHA causes significant impairment in the endothelial and vascular function, NO bioactivity, autonomic function, the renin-angiotensin system, and lipid profiles. It has been hypothesized that premenopausal hypoestrogenemia caused by ovarian disruption, including that induced by FHA, increases the risk for the premature acquisition and accelerated development of atherosclerosis in these patients. In hypoestrogenic women with FHA, measures of flow-mediated dilation (FMD) indicate that the positive effects on endothelial function typically conferred by exercise are not realized, but possibly reversed. It has been suggested that long term estrogen deficiency may alter vasculature structure and responsiveness, as an impaired response to exogenous NO by arterial smooth muscle has been demonstrated in patients with FHA.

Although hypoestrogenism is the main cause of impaired cardiovascular health in FHA, patients also suffer from metabolic disturbances and an overall negative energy balance that further increases the risk of CVD. Women with FHA caused by exercised-induced factors tend to have a higher lipid profile. As is expected from the presence of heightened levels of superoxides and decreased NO bioavailability in women with FHA, it has been found that LDLc is mildly elevated at rest in these women, and it is more susceptible to oxidation after intense exercise; these levels inversely relate to brachial artery FMD in the same population. While it is not known if reported endothelial dysfunction is caused by LDLc oxidation in these women, the positive relationship between LDLc and atherosclerosis risk are well documented.

A relationship between FHA and diabetes mellitus has been studied, with women who have both FHA and diabetes mellitus having a higher risk for CVD than women who have only diabetes mellitus. Studies indicate that the loss of endogenous estrogens through hypothalamic suppression may worsen an already-existing hyperglycemia, further antagonizing estrogen-mediated NO release and compounding the risk for vascular dysfunction in patients with both FHA and diabetes mellitus.

=== Neurological ===
High levels of cortisol caused by FHA is seen not just in peripheral tissues, but also in the cerebrospinal fluid (CSF), where it is unbound and therefore more biologically available. FHA accelerates the onset of aging syndromes, such as osteoporosis and vaginal atrophy. Because of the high levels of cortisol in the CSF, it is suggested that the chronic stress that causes FHA may alter not just the endocrinological secretory patterns, but also the neurological secretory patterns. This altering can impact brain health, and can lead to an increased risk in neurological aging syndromes, such as dementia and Alzheimer's disease (AD).

The low levels of estrogen seen in FHA may also contribute to the increased neurodegenerative risk. Microglia are the main immune cells of the central nervous system (CNS) and protect the brain. Estrogen is a significant regulator of microglia, and limits the inflammation that occurs when the brain is stressed (e.g. due to bacteria, viruses, hypoxia). In FHA, the lack of adequate estrogen levels, combined with the chronic stress that causes FHA, promotes a neuroinflammatory state that can cause impaired neuron formation and neuronal stem cell survival, and promote neurodegenerative diseases. However, more research is needed to find a direct link between FHA and its long term effects on neurological health.

=== Mental and sexual health ===
While it is known that mental and sexual health is related to estrogen levels in women, there are limited studies concerning FHA and mental and sexual health. Links to serotonin, dopamine, and allopregnanolone fluctuations have been found in women with FHA. Ghrelin concentrations have been found to be linked to higher levels of disordered eating behaviors in FHA patients, compared to both exercising and sedentary controls. The degree of disordered and restrictive eating behaviors have been positively associated with PYY concentrations in women with anorexia nervosa, and fasting PYY has been linked to a drive for thinness in exercising women. This suggests that increased PYY may decrease the drive to increase energy intake which typically occurs when ghrelin levels are elevated: it is this dysregulation which may directly cause the psychopathological phenotype that increases susceptibility to developing chronic negative energy through restrictive eating patterns. The increased cortisol release caused by FHA can contribute to fluctuating moods, difficulty coping with common life events and stresses, and disordered eating, as serum cortisol levels correlate with the Hamilton Rating Scale for Depression (HAM-D) and Anxiety (HAM-A). Psychological well-being can be altered in response to low energy availability (LEA), but LEA may also preclude psychological problems. It has been suggested that a higher drive for thinness may serve as a proxy for LEA; a higher drive for thinness has been reported in amenorrheic females than eumenorrheic females. Studies have shown similarities between women affected with FHA and women affected with anorexia nervosa, including a tendency towards depression, bulimic tendencies, cognitive restraint problems with maturity and social security, introversion, inability to manage stress and an obsession with dieting and weight.

Women with FHA tend to have more sexual problems, contributing to the mental health issues and hormonal imbalances associated with FHA. However, more studies are needed to determine the effects of FHA on sexual health.

== Risk factors ==
FHA is caused by a chronic energy deprivation and negative energy balance, with links to three main risk factors: stress, weight, and exercise. It can occur in females of all ages, with the cause usually involving at least two out of the three factors. When energy levels are low, FHA has been postulated to present as an adaptive mechanism that enables energy to be properly allocated for the purpose of survival rather than high energetic cost of reproduction. Thus, inadequate energy intake to fuel these processes results in the initiation of a number of energy conservation strategies, including suppression of T_{3}, IGF-1, leptin, insulin, as well as increases in peptide YY (PYY), cortisol, growth hormone (GH), and ghrelin. All of these modulators cause energy to be moved away from growth and reproduction in order to maintain vital cellular processes, thereby suppressing the aforementioned processes. The effect of nutrition/metabolic status on reproduction is mediated through GnRH secretion. GABA neurons, KNDy neurons, and leptin are specifically responsible for alterations in GnRH secretion. GABA and KNDy neurons synapse with GnRH neurons at sites where leptin receptors are absent to favor LH release. Decreased leptin results in decreased LH release and is observed in periods of long term caloric restriction and fasting. These effects appear to be dose-dependent, where cases of more severe energy restriction (due to inadequate caloric intake or excess exercise) result in greater alterations of LH pulsatility. It is easy to see from these interplays why anorexics with decreased leptin, and athletes who consume less calories than they expend, are likely to present with FHA as a mechanism to preserve energy for processes critical to survival.

=== Stress-related ===
Excessive or intense psychosocial, emotional, or mental stress can lead to hypothalamic dysfunction. In adolescents, this is called "adolescence crisis" and can occur during, or post, puberty. This crisis can cause young adults to develop behavioral or eating disorders (mentioned below), and, if severe and prolonged enough, can result in the menstrual irregularities seen in FHA.

When the body is stressed, the sympathetic adrenal-medullary (SAM) axis is activated, followed by the hypothalamic-pituitary-adrenal (HPA) axis. These events suppress the HPO axis, because the corticotropin-releasing hormone (CRH) released by the HPA axis inhibits the secretion of GnRH by the hypothalamus. CRH also stimulates secretion of beta(β)-endorphins, which suppresses release of GnRH and dopamine. Inhibition of dopamine allows for an increase in prolactin secretion and concentration (hyperprolactinemia), which leads to inhibition of LH, and in turn leads to anovulation. Inhibition of the HPO axis also results in inhibition of the hypothalamic-pituitary-thyroid (HPT) axis and a decrease in thyroid hormones, in an attempt to minimize energy depletion. This allows the body to focus on survival, rather than reproduction.

High concentrations of dopamine and low concentrations of prolactin (and serotonin) can also cause FHA. Females with these levels characteristically have higher levels of aggression, higher levels of testosterone, and lower levels of estrogen.

=== Weight-related ===
FHA can affect women who are underweight, normal weight, or overweight. Risk factors for adolescents and young women generally include eating disorders, such as anorexia nervosa or bulimia nervosa. Even in normal-weight patients, it is important to watch for the presentation of symptoms of anorexia in both physical and laboratory work-ups; this is especially true when recent encounters with emotional stress and conflicts are reported. Weight loss in the context of systemic illness may also cause FHA, especially in the presence of narcotics. These are known to inhibit GnRH pulsations and shut down the pituitary-ovarian axis and, therefore, the effects of narcotics on reproductive health should be considered for women of reproductive age. The risk of FHA due to weight-related factors increases across a series of four behaviors: 1) aesthetic dieting; 2) dieting due to obsessive ideals about diet and/or weight; 3) suppression of appetite, whether by drugs or self; 4) eating disorder, generally anorexia nervosa. Patients affected by eating disorders have overactive hypothalamic-pituitary systems, causing increased cortisol release and elevated β-endorphin concentrations. Hyperactivation of the hypothalamic-pituitary system appears to be manifested through increased secretion of CRH and beta-endorphin by the central nervous system, both of which can alter GnRH pulsatility. LH secretion may return to prepubertal levels, which is likely due to decreased GnRH secretion. While weight gain may restore patterns of LH and GnRH secretion, up to 50% may remain anovulatory; patients with anorexia nervosa have an additional decrease in thyroid hormones. One reason for hypercortisolemia in these patients is the effort to maintain euglycemia in a low energy availability (EA) state, which works in conjunction with GH. Mobilization of lipid stores have been indicated by the inverse relationship between cortisol levels and fat free mass (FFM): AN patients with the lowest BMIs, FFM, and fasting glucose levels have been found to exhibit the highest levels of cortisol.

Both significant weight loss and weight gain can cause FHA through insulin. Significant weight loss, as in eating disorders and chronic malnutrition, is characterized by low insulin levels. Significant weight gain can lead to obesity and insulin resistance, which mimics low insulin levels via functional hypoinsulinaemia. As insulin assists in regulating the HPO axis, these low, or functionally low, levels of insulin can cause FHA, as mice models suggest that low insulin levels decrease levels of circulating LH.

Several other compounds may also influence the onset of weight-induced FHA. Fibroblast growth factor (FGF-21), a liver-derived hormone, is up-regulated in response to starvation and has been linked to starvation-induced amenorrhea in mice via its negative effects on the hypothalamic signalling. Mice transgenic for FGF-21 are anovulatory, and LH surges can only be induced with administration of GnRH. These mice also display decreased expression of the Kiss-1 gene in the anteroventral periventricular nuclei of the hypothalamus. The product of this gene, kisspeptin, is known to be a dominant stimulator of GnRH secretion. A correlation has also been found between anorexic patients and decreased levels of mean total and free testosterone, which has not been consistently demonstrated in non-anorexic patients with FHA.

=== Exercise-related ===
Exercise-related factors generally affect athletes who participate in sports that require intensive training and a low body weight, causing a net energy deficiency. FHA due to excessive exercise has been defined as an at least 6-month absence of menses in otherwise healthy females lacking chronic severe illness who exercise eight or more hours per week. Compared to non-exercising women, whose rate of amenorrhea is 2-5%, the rate of amenorrhea in competitive and recreational athletes ranges from 2-46%; it is also common for women with highly active jobs who do not engage in exercise to also have menstrual dysfunction. FHA in female athletes is commonly part of the female athlete triad, which has been renamed to relative energy deficiency in sport (RED-S), as the triad is also seen in males, with hypogonadotropic hypogonadism replacing the FHA component. Projected effects of RED-S on performance include decreases in endurance performance, muscle strength, training response, coordination, concentration, and glycogen stores, and increases in irritability, impaired judgement, and risk of depression and injuries. FHA is found in 5 to 25% of female athletes, depending on the sport and level of competition level, with a higher prevalence in sports in which a low body weight is favorable. Up to 69% of female athletes practicing these sports (e.g. long-distance runners, gymnasts, ballet dancers, swimmers) can be affected by FHA, as disordered eating is also often a component.

Exercise alone is known to hyperactivate the HPA axis, but the fact that LH pulsatility is altered in amenorrheic female athletes indicates the role of negative energy balance, rather than exercise intensity per se, in menstrual irregularities. When energy balance is maintained, exercise alone has not been indicated as a factor which leads to menstrual dysfunction; however, disturbances are common in weight-stable exercising women without extreme caloric deficiency who experience negative energy balance due to high energy expenditure. This negative energy balance, in turn, causes both a state of hypometabolism as well as hormonal and metabolic alterations. Genetic predisposition, psychological stress, and hypoleptinemia caused by low FFM may, in some cases, combine with the negative energy state to inhibit the hypothalamic generation of GnRH pulses required for regular menstrual cycling, thereby causing hypoestrogenism. Additionally, in athletes with exercise-induced FHA, there have been specific associations between hypercortisolism and decreased LH pulsatility. In endurance athletes with varying menstrual status, the number of menses in the past 12 months has been found to be negatively associated with diurnal cortisol secretion. It is also possible that factors such as exercise intensity and duration, as well as athletic discipline, have differing effects on GnRH pulsatility; this may be especially relevant for women participating in sports that emphasize strength over leanness. However, excessive exercise can cause FHA in normal weight patients who present no abnormal metabolic or gonadotropic laboratory results. In these cases, combined hormonal contraceptive pills will not address the primary cause of menstrual cessation: inhibition of the HPO axis due to excessive exercise. Thus, behavioral modifications should be pursued.

While hypoestrogenemia has been linked to an increase in inflammatory markers in postmenopausal women, this correlation does not seem to contribute to endothelial dysfunction in patients with exercise-associated amenorrhea (EAA). Potential causes for this dissociation are the known anti-inflammatory effects of exercise training and moderate caloric restriction via increased glucocorticoid and ghrelin production, among other factors. While the role of ovulatory status on these cardiovascular adaptations is unclear, moderate negative energy balance has been found to increase vagal tone, thereby lowering resting heart rate and systolic blood pressure in animals.

Whether due to surgery or menopause, estrogen deficiency has also been shown to increase low-density lipoprotein (LDLc) and decrease high-density lipoprotein (HDLc) in women, whereas endogenous estrogen, exercise training and caloric restriction without malnutrition have been found to do the opposite in eumenorrheic controls. In an interesting position between these two alternatives, elevations in total cholesterol, LDLc, apolipoprotein B, and triglycerides are common in women with EAA. At the same time, this population is also likely to display the characteristic increase in HDLc expected to result from exercise training and caloric restriction. Despite these increases, however, the concentrations do not exceed the traditionally recommended limits of cholesterol management. At present, it is unknown if the positive effects of HDLc are able to counteract the effects of elevated LDLc in this population. Another juxtaposition is found in the fact that, rather than improving BMD, as is expected by exercise, patients with EAA commonly display osteopenia. If exercise contributes to a negative energy balance, either through excess activity or inadequate caloric intake, stress and skeletal fractures, as well as premature bone loss, becomes a significant risk.

Some studies suggest female athletes with FHA may also be affected by hyperandrogenism in addition to hypoestrogenism, and it is the hyperandrogenism (as seen in polyendocrine metabolic ovarian syndrome (PMOS)) that causes the menstrual irregularity, rather than chronic low energy availability and low estrogen levels. While this population may also suffer from higher fasting glucose and blood pressure, less stress fractures and higher BMDs have been observed in patients whose FHA may be due to hyperandrogenemia. However, although further studies and analysis is needed in this area, these findings may imply that LH/FSH ratios could be used as a future biomarker of metabolic and skeletal health in amenorrheic female athletes.

=== Genetic predisposition ===
Idiopathic hypogonadotropic hypogonadism (IHH), otherwise known as congenital GnRH deficiency, has a known genetic basis. This heterogenous disease is caused by defects in GnRH secretion from the pituitary or the effect of GnRH on the pituitary. Implicated loci encode proteins necessary for proper GnRH secretion, action, and neuronal development. The variable expressivity of the disorder, likely resulting from epigenetic modifications and/or multiple genetic defects, has led to the hypothesis that mutations involved in IHH cause increased risk for the functional GnRH deficiency observed in FHA patients. Heterozygous mutations at loci implicated in IHH have been shown to be present in patients with FHA at a rate higher than eumenorrheic controls. The genes implicated included the following: FGFR1, which is involved in the specification, fate, migration, and survival of GnRH-secreting neurons; PROKR2 and KAL1, which enable the migration of GnRH-secreting neurons; and GNRHR, which encodes the pituitary receptor activated by GnRH1. Mutations in PROKR2 or FGFR1 may cause mechanistic dysfunction of GnRH pathways, either by decreasing the number of GnRH-secreting cells that are able to migrate to the hypothalamus in development, inhibiting maturation of these cells during maturity, or disrupting GnRH secretion in adulthood. FHA patients harboring these mutations have been shown to be able to resume regular menses, further reinforcing that, while genetic defects may predispose one to the condition, environmental factors play a pivotal role in disease manifestation. It is possible that heterozygosity at these loci are not sufficient to cause IHH, but decrease the threshold for HPO inhibition due to environmental factors such as weight loss, stress, and excessive exercise. Functionally speaking, carrying these mutations could confer a selective advantage in a famine conditions, and it is not uncommon for the alleles to be inherited from an asymptomatic parents in both heterozygous and homozygous recessive manifestations of IHH.

== Pathophysiology ==
=== Hormonal ===
FHA results from a functional reduction or disruption in GnRH release due to chronic negative energy balance, metabolism, body composition, and stress; such risk factors become relevant in cases of emotional stress, excessive exercise, and nutrient starvation. Metabolic cues, including an increase in body weight, are influential in the initiation of pulsatile GnRH release from the hypothalamus during puberty; this event allows for the pituitary to begin producing and releasing pulses of LH. Full folliculogenesis cannot occur if the initial GnRH drive is disrupted, and this can be caused by reduced leptin from loss of body fat due to nutritional deprivation, excessive exercise in which the calories burned are more than those consumed, and states of hypercortisolism due to stress-inducing attitudinal or environmental pressures. Specifically, this underlies why the hypothalamus is necessarily sensitive to internal and external stimuli in its regulation of menstruation. Complete synchrony of the HPO axis is required for ovulation and reproduction in order to ensure pulsatile release of GnRH. Without this pulsatile release, the reduced levels of gonadotropins LH and FSH are insufficient to maintain full folliculogenesis and ovulatory ovarian function, resulting in profound hypoestrogenism.

Additionally, external stress factors activate the HPA axis; increased corticotropin-releasing hormone (CRH) secretion results in increased secretion of ACTH from the pituitary gland, and thus increased secretion of cortisol from the adrenal glands. CRH, a regulator of the HPA and HPO axis, can be stimulated for release by the central nervous system in states of physical or mental stress that accompany the lifestyle factors contributing to amenorrhea. As a result, ACTH is released from the pituitary gland, along with other pro-opiomelanocortin-related peptides such as beta-endorphin and b-lipotropic hormone. It is possible that increased levels of ghrelin in amenorrheic populations sensitizes the adrenal cortex to ACTH and is thereby associated with both hypothalamic CRH release and the frequency of cortisol bursts. Glucocorticosteroids are generally associated with inhibition of GnRH, adding strength to the stress-induced hypothesis of amenorrhea in some patients. By stimulating beta-endorphin, a hypothalamic and pituitary endogenous peptide, CRH can indirectly alter LH function by acting upstream on GnRH. A combination of this factor, along with the direct inhibition of GnRH caused by elevated CRH, may suggest a relationship between the incidence of stress- and exercise-related FHA and opioidergic activity. FHA patients have been found to have higher 24-hour mean plasma cortisol levels as well as increased cerebrospinal and urinary free cortisol levels; cortisol has negative effects on reproduction at the level of the hypothalamus, pituitary, and uterus. The increase in glucocorticoids inhibits the release of GnRH and gonadotropins and contributes to the pathophysiology of stress-related FHA. It is currently unknown whether recovery from AN or FHA results in restoration of normal levels of cortisol, as there has not been a strong trend defined towards normalization associated with increases in BMI or changes in body composition. Not insignificant is the necessity of prolonged HPA activation in the ability of this pathway to alter hypothalamic and/or pituitary control of ovulatory function, as mild fluctuations in these hormones do not appear to cause dysfunction. Thus, reproductive function can be altered through psychological or physiological stress through the HPA axis due to the modulatory effects that this pathway has on the HPO axis: its activation, which can occur in states of low energy availability (LEA) as an adaptive response to physical, nutritional, or extreme emotional stress, causes the release of CRH; In turn, this leads to the inhibition of GnRH pulsatility directly at the level of the hypothalamus and therefore precludes multilevel inhibition of the HPO axis. The hypothalamic-pituitary-thyroid axis is also altered in FHA; TSH levels are low-to-normal and there is an increase in reverse triiodothyronine and low level of triiodothyronine. Relative energy expenditure (REE) is also closely linked to T_{3}, as is evidenced by a correlation between macronutrient intake, REE, and thyroid hormone levels. It has been found that AN patients who regain weight can restore T_{3} and REE independent of changes in FFM.

Other hormonal changes in FHA include increased levels of nighttime serum growth hormone (GH), decreased levels of 24 hour prolactin, low serum insulin and IGF-1, and increased insulin sensitivity. GH has been found to be higher systemically in AN and exercise-induced FHA, with women who have the lowest FFM and body mass index BMI displaying the highest levels of circulating GH The result is peripheral resistance to GH, and this underlies the reduction in hepatic IGF-1 synthesis observed in many of these patients. GH may also modulate reproduction at the level of the pituitary and ovaries by altering LH/FSH secretion as well as estradiol and progesterone production. Some studies suggest that GH is needed for the maturation and survival of dominant follicles and corpora lutea. Increased insulin sensitivity is likely common in many FHA patients, because a state of chronic low EA incentivizes high GH secretion to maintain euglycemia; thus, euglycemia can be maintained in FHA patients despite low levels of IGF-1.

=== Neuroendocrine ===
The complex mechanisms of FHA are unclear, though it is known that many neuromodulatory signals are involved in the regulation of pulsatile GnRH secretion. Some notable substances include kisspeptin, neuropeptide Y (NPY), ghrelin, peptide YY (PYY), leptin, adiponectin, CRH, β-endorphin, and allopregnanolone. Kisspeptin and its G-protein coupled receptor, GPR54, activate the HPO axis to directly stimulate GnRH secretion from the hypothalamus. NPY regulates energy balance and affects feeding behavior and appetite. If estradiol (E2) levels are sufficient, NPY induces GnRH secretion. Amenorrheic women have been found to have lower serum NPY than controls. Thus, in these hypoestrogenic subjects, decreased concentrations of this peptide may contribute to the observed disruption of GnRH release. Ghrelin stimulates appetite and inhibits the HPO axis, and it is found to be elevated in patients with FHA. Despite this, many patients with FHA display behaviors which result in low energy intake and therefore weight loss. It can be additionally noted that this trend may also be observed to a lesser extent in ovulatory women who are in negative energy balance due to imposed dieting and exercise strategies. Alternatively, PYY binds to hypothalamic neurons in order to decrease both energy intake and body weight. It has been suggested that the anorexigenic effects of PYY may hide the anticipated orexigenic effects of increased ghrelin levels in exercising and anorexic FHA patients. The combination of these factors could help explain why populations whose conditions have been triggered by low weight or excess exercise are not only more prone to display elevated serum ghrelin levels, but also commonly engage in abnormal eating behaviors. Ghrelin not only reduces fat utilization and stimulates appetite, but increased ghrelin is linked to alterations in GnRH and LH pulsatility, which can ultimately inhibit the HPO axis. Its elevation in women with FHA may account for the inability of some patients who have returned to a healthy weight to return to regular menses.

Conversely, leptin is reduced in patients with FHA and this may suppress GnRH through a kisspeptin-mediated pathway. Leptin and adiponectin are secreted by adipocytes and are directly related to FFM, with the former being directly related and the latter being inversely related. Leptin coordinates metabolic and hormonal signals with reproductive function, and decreased levels of leptin have been shown to decrease LH pulsatile frequency. As leptin mainly decreases feeding behavior, negative energy states have been linked to decreased leptin levels when fat mass is at critically low levels. Thus, hypoleptinemia is often representative of the chronic negative energy balance associated with FHA, and this trend holds true when compared to age-, weight-, and body fat-matched eumenorrheic controls Further, the arcuate nucleus of the hypothalamus, which is known for its regulation of food intake, is considered to be the most concentrated source of both leptin and GnRH receptors in the brain. While GnRH receptors in the hypothalamus do not contain receptors for leptin, a positive correlation has been shown to exist between leptin receptor mRNA and the kisspeptin-expressing cells which are known to stimulate GnRH release.

== Diagnosis ==
Females who have menstrual cycles lasting longer than 45 days and/or amenorrhea for three or more months should be evaluated for FHA. Differentiating FHA from the irregular menstrual patterns seen in adolescents during the initial years after menarche due to immaturity of the HPO axis can be challenging. However, studies have shown that, even during this period, the length of a menstrual cycle does not exceed 45 days. Furthermore, healthy girls with normal BMI (18.5–24.9 kg/m^{2}) should develop regular menstrual cycles (every 28 +/- 3–5 days) within 1–2 years after menarche. FHA is a diagnosis of exclusion, because the diagnosis can only be made when menstruation has ceased without an organic or anatomic pathology. Organic causes of amenorrhea, such as pregnancy, thyroid disorders or inflammatory bowel disease, and endocrinologic etiologies of the thyroid, pituitary, and adrenal glands, ovarian failure, hyperandrogenism and polyendocrine metabolic ovarian syndrome (PMOS) must be excluded before a diagnosis of FHA can be given. A GnRH stimulation or challenge test should be used to identify FHA as the cause of hypogonadotropic hypogonadism in women presenting with symptoms, as hypothalamic dysfunction due to delayed-onset puberty or other pituitary disease will not respond to exogenous GnRH. Hypothalamic disorders are differentiated when GnRH administration results in abnormal increases of gonadotropins. Combined pituitary and hypothalamic impairment is differentiated when there is a decreased or absent response to GnRH secretion; as a result, it impossible to determine if the observed low levels of FSH/LH are due to hypothalamic or pituitary dysfunction, and pulsatile GnRH administration with cyclomate is required to diagnose this distinction (pulsatile LH-RH challenge).

Evaluation for FHA may include a thorough history and physical exam, laboratory testing, and imaging if appropriate. The Endocrine Society Clinical Practice Guidelines on Functional Hypothalamic Amenorrhea suggests obtaining a baseline bone mineral density measurement by DEXA scan from any patient with 6 or more months of amenorrhea. It should be ordered earlier if there is suspicion of skeletal fragility, energy deficit, or nutritional deficiency. Baseline BMD Z-scores of -2.0 or less at any spot should warrant further monitoring in nutritional intake; for athletes involved in weight-bearing sports, this monitoring should begin at -1.0 or less. The spine and hip are the most common site of low BMD in young amenorrheic females as well as predictors of fracture risk. Lower strength estimates, abnormal bone microarchitectures, and deficient volumetric bone density has been found in young adult amenorrheic athletes.

=== History and physical exam ===
To evaluate for FHA, a thorough personal history should be obtained. The patient should be asked about weight loss, level of physical activity, diet, low-weight eating disorders, significant stressors, menstrual pattern, bone fractures, and substance abuse. Acknowledgement that one is categorized by one or more risk factors for FHA is a vulnerable point of discussion for many patients, and psychological consultations may be needed in order to reach a proper diagnosis. Clinicians should attempt to identify any recent emotional crises or otherwise stressful environmental factors which may have contributed to cessation of menses, as a multitude of chronic diseases including anxiety and depression may also lead to amenorrhea. In addition, physicians should also inquire about eating and reproductive disorders within the family. In patients presenting with structural abnormalities that may preclude regular menses, it is still necessary to take emotional history and lifestyle into account before establishing a diagnosis. These patients may still demonstrate patterns of excessive exercise or restrictive eating, proving the important role of behavioral etiology in FHA diagnosis.

A full physical exam, including an external gynecological and bimanual exam, can be performed to assess for organic causes of amenorrhea. Symptoms of hypoestrogenism, whose severity will positively correlate with the duration of hypoestrogenism, will be present in FHA patients; these can include lack of cervical mucus, pale areola and nipples, thinned, reddened vaginal and vestibular epithelium, and uterine hyperplasia, though FHA is not typically associated with hot flashes. FHA may present with weight loss, bradycardia, mottled, cool extremities, and/or yellowing of the skin.

=== Laboratory testing ===
In all cases of amenorrhea, pregnancy should be excluded. This can be done by obtaining serum B-hCG levels. In cases of suspected FHA, screening laboratory tests include a complete blood count (CBC), electrolytes, glucose, bicarbonate, blood urea nitrogen (BUN), creatinine, liver panel, and when appropriate, sedimentation rate and/or C-reactive protein levels. Liver function tests may be abnormal in females with extreme energy restriction. The initial endocrine evaluation includes testing for levels of TSH and free T4, prolactin, LH, FSH, estradiol (E2), and anti-Müllerian hormone (AMH). FHA patients may display a combination of the following: FSH concentrations that are normal but lower than LH levels, low or low normal LH, E2 <50 pg/mL, and progesterone <1 ng/mL. LH and FSH are often normal in FHA patients. No single E2 value can confirm FHA, as each reflects only a certain time point, but, in individuals whose E2 is <20 pg/mL persistently, an acute gonadotropin response to GnRH stimulation may distinguish FHA from hypogonadotropic hypogonadism. Testosterone and prolactin are expected to be in low normal ranges, and gonadotropins will be in a range lower than that which is characteristic of polyendocrine metabolic ovarian syndrome (PMOS). In cases of stress-induced FHA, cortisol secretion, both basal and pulsatile, may be altered—increased concentrations are greatest in the early morning hours and overnight. However, these values may still be in the normal range. If clinical hyperandrogenism is evident, total testosterone and DHEA-S levels may also be obtained.17α-hydroxyprogesteone levels should be evaluated if late onset congenital adrenal hyperplasia is suspected.

A progestin challenge can also be conducted to evaluate levels of estrogen and the anatomic integrity of the outflow tract, as low endometrial estrogen exposure or obstruction of the outflow tract can be consequences of the absence of withdrawal bleeding. It can also provide information about estrogen status when there are questions of whether FHA or PMOS should be the diagnosis. Withdrawal bleeding following the progestin challenge indicates sufficient levels of E2 for endometrial thickening, and that the amenorrhea is a result of anovulation and progesterone deficiency. Other specific cases may warrant other useful measures: for example, IGF-1 may be indicated in FHA patients with AN, as resistance to GH can expose a connection between bone metabolism and malnutrition; this population may also present with low DHEA-S, which may work to actively lower IGF-1 levels.

=== Imaging ===
A transvaginal ultrasound (TVUS) can be used to rule out any anatomic Mullerian tract abnormalities that may result in primary amenorrhea. A brain MRI showing the sella turcica should be obtained in cases of unexplained hypogonadotropic hypogonadism, or when patients show evidence of central nervous system (CNS) symptoms such as severe or persistent headaches, persistent vomiting, changes in vision, thirst, or urination with no attributable cause.

== Management ==
The term "functional" in functional hypothalamic amenorrhea implies that the ovulatory ovarian dysfunction is reversible with correction of the underlying cause. Therefore, it is said that FHA can be reversed by removal of the stressor. Weight restoration is the best predictor of functional recovery of the HPO axis and therefore the main driver to restoration of menstrual function. Correcting energy deficits to improve function of the HPO axis often includes lifestyle changes, such as increasing caloric intake and reducing the level of physical activity with resultant weight gain for normalization of BMI. Menstruation typically resumes after correction of the underlying energy deficit. Patients diagnosed with FHA should be informed that varied menstrual patterns may occur during the recovery phase, and that irregular menses during this time do not preclude conception or require examination. As women with FHA work to correct energy balance, especially female athletes and those recovering from eating disorder, recovery from hypogonadotropic hypogonadism may occur in a series of phases; there can be stages where the luteal phase is inadequate or may display lower sex steroid and gonadotropin levels for many years. These patients may present with long menstrual phases with premenstrual spotting or early arrival of menses. A minimum weight required to restore menses has not been defined, but AN patients with BMI above 18 kg/m^{2}, those who are 95% of their expected body weight, and those who were in the 25th to 50th percentiles of their BMI have been shown in various studies to exhibit a restoration of menses within a short period of time. Leptin concentrations >1.85 ng/mL have been found to regulate the recovery of LH pulsatility. IGF-1 has been linked to nutritional recovery, as women who exhibit menstrual restoration tended to display increases in this compound; this holds true regardless of GH status.

Improving energy balance status, often through behavioral change, is the recommended means for restoring HPO function, and this commonly requires the adoption of behaviors which promote weight gain. Avoidance of chronic stressors and modification of the stress-response with cognitive behavioral therapy (CBT) may also help in cases of FHA associated with significant stress. While the obvious solution to this problem appears to be a natural return to menses through restoration of energy balance and reduction in external stressors, the fact that FHA often presents in women who suffer from patterns of disordered eating and display concerns about body image and/or athletic performance means that increased caloric consumption and decreased physical activity may be rejected. In this population, where success in sport is highly emphasized, decreasing training intensity is typically not an option. Parents and legal guardians should be made aware of the long-term risk factors for osteoporosis and infertility which underlie this condition when deciding on a treatment plan. A multi-disciplinary team approach in management that includes a medical doctor, dietitian, and a psychiatrist or psychologist to provide psychological support is recommended.

If menstruation does not resume spontaneously following lifestyle changes, the patient should be monitored for thyroid function, HPO axis function, and concentrations of ACTH, cortisol, and prolactin every 4–5 months.

Exogenous estrogen administration through ethinyl estradiol-based oral contraceptives have been shown to restore endothelial function in FHA patients. While sexually active patients may be prescribed low-dose contraceptives in some circumstances, these drugs are not recommended for sexually inactive adolescents. Transdermal estradiol and micronized progesterone are the safest options for FHA patients requiring long-term care. Depending on the duration, patches can be cut into quarters to gradually decrease the dose of estrogen administered over the course of treatment. If energy deficit continues, however, this treatment may not protect bone health (see below). Cyclic doses of progestin may be used to ensure endometrial shedding and prevent endometrial hyperplasia.

=== Low bone density ===
Bone loss is best treated by correction of the underlying cause. Patients should undergo evaluation of bone marrow density using a DEXA scan and started on Vitamin D and calcium supplementation. If menstruation does not resume after 6 months with reasonable trial of non-pharmaceutical management, loss of bone mass becomes the main concern. Short-term use of transdermal estradiol E2 with cyclic oral progestin may be used for estrogen replacement. Care must be taken to exclude risks for thromboembolic disease prior to implementation of hormonal therapy given the associated increase in risk for venous thromboembolism. The Endocrine Society Clinical Practice Guidelines on Functional Hypothalamic Amenorrhea (FHA) recommend against oral contraceptives, bisphosphonates, denosumab, testosterone, and leptin for the improvement of bone mass density in FHA. The limited numbers of studies evaluating the effect of bisphosphonates on BMD did not provide significant evidence of improvement, and the scope of studies are inadequate to ensure safety and efficacy in FHA patients. While denosumab has been used to improve fracture risk in postmenopausal women with osteoporosis, it has not been adequately studied in premenopausal women and may pose a risk of inadvertent fetal exposure.

Oral contraceptives for the purpose of regaining menses and improving BMD is not suggested as a first-line treatment, due to their role in the suppression of ovarian function in women who were eumenorrheic prior to treatment and because these drugs may mask the return of spontaneous menstruation while loss of bone mass continues. Many studies have shown that oral contraceptives do not confer a protective advantage on BMD; this is likely because neuroendocrine aberrations, thyroid functions, and hypercortisolism are not corrected. For patients with confounding AN, studies have shown that the prescription of estrogens is not an efficable way to increase BMD, potentially due to factors stemming from an extreme state of undernutrition and IGF-1 deficiency. As oral contraceptive use is known to decrease androgen levels, this raises questions about the efficacy of prescribing of oral contraceptives to FHA patients who also suffer from hypoandrogenemia in conjunction with AN in order to avoid further bone loss. If behavioral modifications are not successful, transdermal estrogen with cyclic oral progestin is recommended, as this combination does not alter IGF-1 secretion. Oestrogens may also prescribed on a case-by-case basis, depending on the patient's goals and expectations with regards to therapeutic outcomes and risks of further bone loss. These drugs, which can include conjugated estrogen, micronized estradiol, and transdermal estrogen, may be implicated to prevent further bone loss and can be administered transdermally or orally. Recombinant parathyroid hormone 1-34 (rPTH) may be used in rare cases of adults with FHA whose BMD is extremely low or display delayed fracture healing.

=== Anovulatory infertility ===
Following a complete fertility workup, the first line of treatment for anovulatory infertility secondary to FHA is pulsatile exogenous GnRH followed by gonadotropin therapy and induction of ovulation when GnRH is unavailable. This therapy is recommended for avoiding multiple gestation and severe ovarian hyperstimulation syndrome. Specifically in patients where changes in exercise intensity or alterations in diet do not restore eumenorrhea, ovulation can be induced with clomiphene citrate. However, induction of ovulation by clomiphene citrate should be restricted to patients with a BMI ≥18.5 kg/m^{2} due to the increased risks associated with lower BMI, including fetal loss, small for gestational age (SGA) babies, preterm labor, and delivery by Cesarean section. Clomiphene citrate or letrozole may also be used to induce follicular development when endogenous estrogen levels are low. It has been found that teenagers with FHA who present as low responders to clomiphene do not necessarily face a poor prognosis with regards to future menses or fertility. Despite a growing body of research, leptin and kisspeptin therapies are not yet recommended for treating infertility.

=== Psychological assessment ===
Patients with FHA should be screened for the presence of modifiable Axis I (mood) disorders or modified Axis II (personality) disorders and referred to appropriate psychiatric care where they can receive psychological support, such as CBT. This is especially true when psychological disorders (e.g. anorexia nervosa) co-present with amenorrhea through associated behaviors like excessive exercise and restrictive eating. In many of these cases, recovery may require CBT to modify the attitudes of patients who display abnormal behaviors related to diet, body image, exercise, and/or stress management. CBT may become a necessary consideration for this group of patients when general education about the health risks associated with long-term FHA do not motivate a change in behavior. Behavioral modifications which lead to a reversal of amenorrhea can simultaneously reduce cortisol levels and restore of ovarian function. It is also postulated that metabolic and neuroendocrine aberrations can be corrected with behavioral modifications. Studies have shown that in comparison to control groups, FHA patients who receive CBT had a heightened ability to restore ovulatory status and improve levels of leptin, TSH, and cortisol. Thus, stress reduction through CBT may correct the metabolic and neuroendocrine defects of energy deficiency independent of direct weight gain.
