= Exercise amenorrhoea =

- Specialty: Gynaecology

Exercise amenorrhoea is a medical condition in which women involved in heavy exercise experience absence of menstruation of varying periods of time. It occurs because of neuroendocrine dysfunction and is usually reversible. Exercise amenorrhoea is a component of female athlete triad.

== Etiology ==
Exercise induced amenorrhoea occurs in 5-25% of athletes and 1.8% of the general population. The incidence is higher in marathon runners and is more frequent in women who weigh less and were slightly younger. Exercise amenorrhoea has also been reported in ballet dancers, cyclists, swimmers and those involved in non-weight bearing sports.

== Pathophysiology ==
There occurs a suppression in the generation of gonadotropin releasing hormone (GnRH). The secretion of GnRH normally occurs in a pulsatile fashion, every 60 to 90 minutes. This is absent in exercise amenorrhoea. The function of GnRH is to stimulate the secretion of leutinizing hormone (LH) and follicle stimulating hormone (FSH). As a result, LH and to a certain extent FSH are secreted in low quantities. These hormones are necessary for normal menstruation, and result in amenorrhoea if not secreted in adequate quantities.

== Diagnosis ==
Exercise amenorrhoea is a diagnosis of exclusion. Girls who exercise at a young age may have primary amenorrhoea. The differential diagnosis are androgen excess, pituitary tumours (rare), tumours of the third ventricle (rare) or other conditions leading to chronic malnutrition. Diet history and bone density investigations should also be done to determine if female athlete triad is present.

== Management ==
Exercise amenorrhoea can be managed by eating a diet rich in calories and by decreasing the duration and intensity of exercise for at least 12 months. Amenorrhea usually persists and may take over 6 months to reverse.
