= Senile osteoporosis =

- Other names: Osteoporosis type II

Senile osteoporosis has been recently recognized as a geriatric syndrome with a particular pathophysiology. There are different classification of osteoporosis: primary, in which bone loss is a result of aging and secondary, in which bone loss occurs from various clinical and lifestyle factors. Primary, or involuntary osteoporosis, can further be classified into Type I or Type II. Type I refers to postmenopausal osteoporosis and is caused by the deficiency of estrogen. While senile osteoporosis is categorized as an involuntary, Type II, and primary osteoporosis, which affects both men and women over the age of 70 years. It is accompanied by vitamin D deficiency, body's failure to absorb calcium, and increased parathyroid hormone.

Research over the years has shown that senile osteoporosis is the product of a skeleton in an advanced stage of life and can be caused by a deficiency caused by calcium. However, physicians are also coming to the conclusion that multiple mechanisms in the development stages of the disease interact together resulting in an osteoporotic bone, regardless of age. Still, elderly people make up the fastest growing population in the world. As bone mass declines with age, the risk of fractures increases. Annual incidence of osteoporotic fractures is more than 1.5 million in the US and notably 20% of people die during the first year after a hip fracture.

It costs the US health system around $17 billion annually, with the cost projecting to $50 billion by 2040. These costs represent a higher burden compared to other disease states, such as breast cancer, stroke, diabetes, or chronic lung disease. Although there are cost effective and well-tolerated treatments, 23% of the diagnosed are women over 67 have received either bone mineral density (BMD) tests or prescription for treatment after fracture. The clinical and economic burdens indicate there should be more effort in assessment of risk, prevention, and early intervention when it comes to osteoporosis.

== Presentation ==
=== Complications ===
Because senile osteoporosis is caused by the loss of bone mass due to aging, the bones are more fragile and thus more prone to fractures and fracture-related complications. These complications can include a more than doubled risk increase for future fractures and a lower quality of life resulting from chronic pain or disability, sometimes needing long-term nursing care. Depending on the site, pathologic fractures can also increase relative mortality risk. Hip fractures alone are particularly debilitating and have a nearly 20% higher mortality rate within one year of the fracture. Other fractures are more subtle and can go undetected for some time. For example, vertebral compression fractures in the spine, often noticeable by a loss of vertical height, can occur even during routine motions like twisting, coughing, and reaching.

In addition to decreased bone mineral density, there are other factors that contribute to fracture risk such as advanced age, lower body mass index, fracture history, smoking, steroid use, high alcohol intake, and fall history. Studies linking alcohol and fracture risk define high intake as three or more drinks per day. High caffeine intake may also play a role in fracture risk. Many healthcare organizations also utilize a Fracture Risk Assessment Tool (FRAX) that can estimate a 10-year probability of having an osteoporotic fracture based on an individual's health information and the criteria listed above.

== Cause ==
Bone remodeling, or the absorption and resorption of bone, is a natural mechanism that occurs to repair and strengthen bones in the body. However, an imbalance between the resorption and formation of bone occurs as people age, contributing to the development of senile osteoporosis. The aging of cortical and trabecular bones in particular cause the decrease in bone density in the elderly population. Although most of the etiologic considerations regarding senile osteoporosis are not very clear for physicians yet, risk factors of osteoporosis have been identified. These factors include gender, age, hormone imbalances, reduced bone quality, and compromised integrity of bone microarchitecture.

Based on the current evidence attached to clinical experimentation, there is some evidence that the pathogenesis of the disease is related to a deficiency of zinc. Such deficiency is known to lead to an increment of endogenous heparin, which is most likely caused by mast cell degranulation, and an increase in the bone resorption (calcium discharge in the bones) reaction of prostaglandin E2, which constrain the formation of more bone mass, making bones more fragile. These co-factors are shown to play an important role in the pathogenetic process attached to senile osteoporosis as they enhance the action of the parathyroid hormone.

The intake of calcium in elder people is quite low, and this problem is worsened by a reduced capability to ingest it. This, attached to a decrease in the absorption of vitamin D concerning metabolism, are also factors that contributes to a diagnosis of osteoporosis type II.

=== Risk factors ===
While senile osteoporosis (type II) is mainly attributed to age, other risks include medical, pharmacological, genetic, and environmental factors. Peak bone mass is a major determinant of bone density, which starts in utero and is typically complete by the age 40.

==== Medical ====
Though secondary osteoporosis is a separate category when it comes to osteoporosis diagnosis, it can still be a contributing factor to primary osteoporosis. Secondary osteoporosis can be present in pre- and post-menopausal women and in men and have found to be factors contributing to osteoporosis in both sexes (50-80% of men and 30% of post-menopausal women). Therefore, when treating people over 70, it is important to exclude secondary causes of osteoporosis which include endocrine disorders (e.g. hyperthyroidism and diabetes mellitus), gastrointestinal, hepatic and nutritional disorders (e.g. celiac disease and inflammatory bowel disease), hematological disorders (e.g. systemic mastocytosis), renal disorders (e.g. chronic kidney disease), and autoimmune disorders (e.g. rheumatoid arthritis and systemic lupus erythematosus).

==== Medications ====
Medications that can contribute to bone loss include aluminum (found in antacids), aromatase inhibitors, cyclosporine, depo-medroxyprogesterone (premenopausal), glucocorticoids, lithium, proton pump inhibitors, serotonin reuptake inhibitors, tacrolimus, and tamoxifen (premenopausal). These medications can contribute to bone loss and can increase risk for osteoporotic fractures.

==== Genetic ====
Maternal body build, lifestyle, and vitamin D status are some of the genetic and epigenetic effects that have been found to affect the BMD, specifically the developmental plasticity.

Additionally, other studies have found that race (e.g. Black women have the lowest risk), age (i.e. older age), body mass (i.e. lower weight), and gender (female) play a role in contributing to the risk of osteoporosis. Although the incidence of developing osteoporosis and hip fractures vary between population groups, older age is consistently associated with a higher incidence of fractures due to osteoporosis.

==== Social and nutritional factors ====
There are several environmental and social factors that can contribute to the risk of developing osteoporosis. Smoking tobacco can increase the risk by decreasing the ability of the intestine to absorb calcium. Caffeine intake and heavy alcohol were also correlated with the decrease in bone density in the elderly population.

Without proper intake of vitamin D and calcium, it can increase the risk of osteoporosis in the elderly. These vitamin deficiencies pose as a risk factor, as it can decrease bone mass, decrease calcium absorption, and increase in bone turnover. There are also various medications can that interfere with the absorption of calcium, such as anticonvulsants, diuretics, corticosteroids, immunosuppressive medications, some antibiotics, and NSAIDS.

== Diagnosis ==
Because the diagnosis of osteoporosis is made only after a pathologic fracture has occurred, it is best to take serial bone density (also known as bone mineral density or BMD) measurement scans for high risk individuals (elderly). The World Health Organization (WHO) has established a diagnostic criteria for osteoporosis using BMD T-scores which describes an individual's BMD in terms of the number of SDs by which is differs from the mean peak value in young, healthy persons of the same sex—currently more than 2.5 SDs below the mean as the criterion for osteoporosis. For osteopenia (low bone mass) the range is 1.0 SD to less than 2.5 SDs below the mean. However, T-scores were initially used as an estimation of the prevalence of osteoporosis across populations not to assess osteoporosis prevalence in specific individuals which lead to the National Osteoporosis Foundation and the International Society for Clinical Densitometry to consider using dual-energy X-ray absorptiometry (DXA) of the hip and/or spine as the preferred measurement diagnosis of osteoporosis.

== Prevention ==
Of the risks listed above, falls contribute most significantly to the incidence of osteoporotic fractures. Regular exercise has the strongest correlation in decreasing fall risk. Back and posture exercises such as tai chi as well as weight-bearing exercises such as walking can slow bone loss, improve balance, and strengthen muscles. There are also precautions that can be taken at home to reduce the risk of falling. These include anchoring rugs to the floor, minimizing clutter, improving overall lighting and visibility, and installing handrails in stairways and hallways.

== Treatment ==
Calcium and vitamin D3 intake from diet or supplementation are crucial in the ethiopathogenesis of this disease; therefore, the effective treatments should consist of non pharmacological methods (such as a modified diet with more calcium 1000–1500 mg/day and vitamin D3 intake of 600-800 IU/day, exercising, smoking cessation, and alcohol restriction), fall prevention, and individually chosen pharmacological intervention (antiresorptive agent like bisphosphonate or estrogen replacement therapy in women). Given bone fracture (hip, vertebrae, and colles) is a devastating complication of osteoporosis, vitamin D3 combined with calcium are used as primary prevention, along with alendronate, residronate, strontium and zoledronic acid which have proven efficacy in primary and secondary hip fracture prevention. The Institute of Medicine recommends a daily allowance of 800 IU of Vitamin D for people 70 and over, to get to a level of serum 25-hydroxyvitamin D (25OHD) of at least 20 ng/ml (50 nmol/liter) in addition to a daily allowance of 1,200 mg of calcium.

One systematic review of pharmacological agents from 2008 on postmenopausal woman age 65 found bisphosphonates to be more efficacious in improvement of bone marrow density and reduction of vertebral fractures compared to placebo. This systematic review also found that parathyroid hormone and estrogen/progesterone therapy had significant improvements in bone marrow density compared to placebo. In addition to bisphosphonates, pharmacological treatments for osteoporosis can include calcitonin, parathyroid hormone 1-34, hormone replacement therapy, and monoclonal antibody therapy. Another systematic review published in the Journal of American Geriatrics Society from 2017 showed that among men with risk of osteoporotic fracture, bisphosphonates had significant reduction in fracture compared to placebo, while calcitonin and monoclonal antibody therapy did not show efficacy compared to placebo.

In post-menopausal older women, estrogen therapy (but not low-dose conjugated estrogens or ultra-low-dose estradiol) may reduce the incidence of new vertebral, non-vertebral, and hip fractures. Selective estrogen-receptor modulators such as raloxifene have been FDA approved to treat osteoporosis as it inhibits bone resorption, slightly increases spine BMD but have not been proved efficacious in antifracture properties.

Even though more studies are necessary for an efficient evaluation of the role played by zinc in senile osteoporosis, some doctors may recommend a proper supplementation of dietary zinc in addition to calcium and vitamin D3.
