= Late period =

Late period may refer to:

- a sign of pregnancy
- Oligomenorrhea, a type of menstrual disorder
- Late Period of ancient Egypt, 664 BC until 332 BC
