= Estrogen patch =

Transdermal delivery system for estrogens

- Drug class
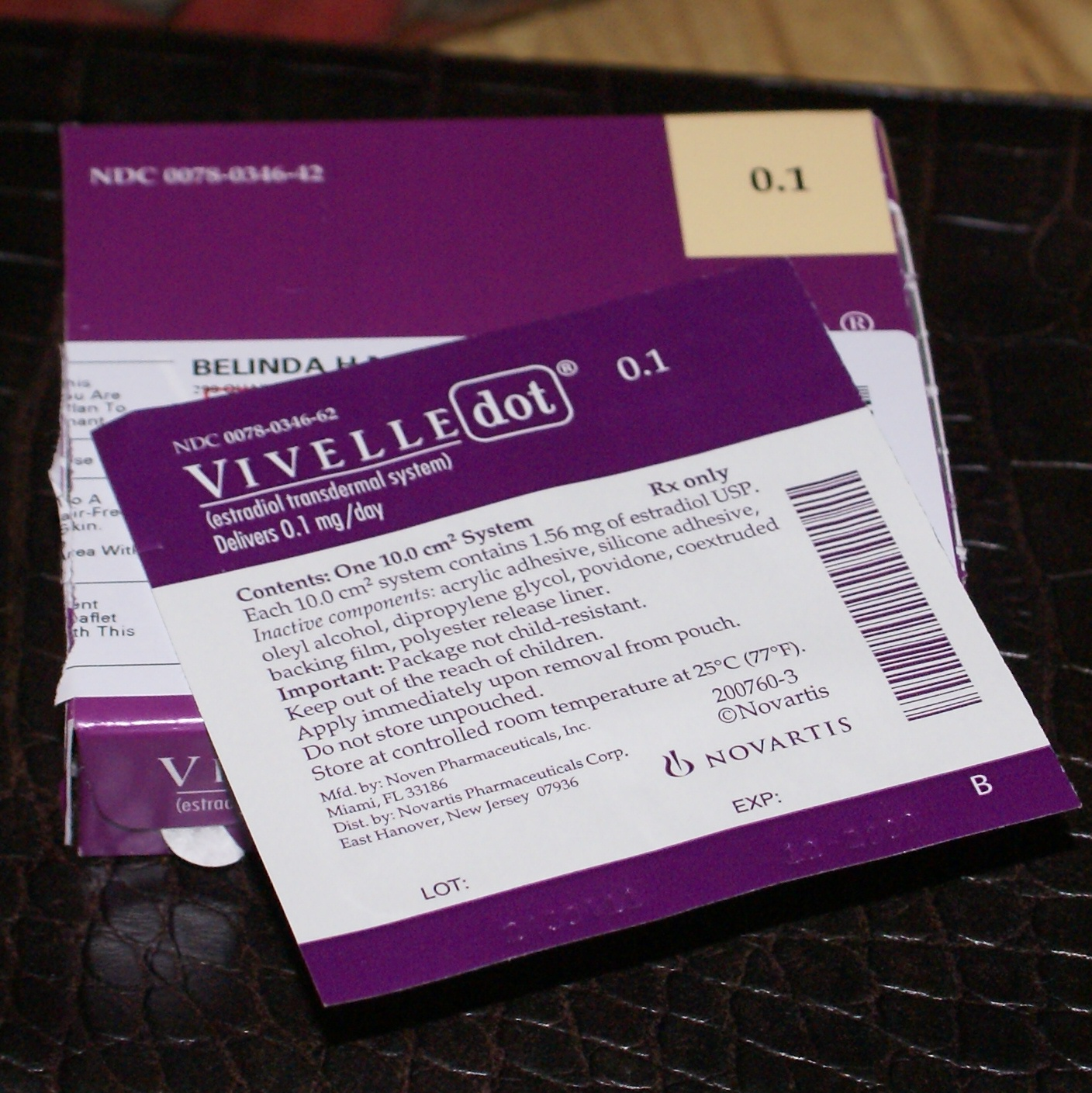
- Vivelle-Dot, an estrogen patch

Class identifiers
- Use: Menopause, hypogonadism, feminizing hormone therapy, contraception, prostate cancer, others
- Biological target: Estrogen receptors (ERα, ERβ, mERs (e.g., GPER, others))

Legal status

An estrogen patch, or oestrogen patch, is a transdermal delivery system for estrogens such as estradiol and ethinylestradiol which can be used in menopausal hormone therapy, feminizing hormone therapy for transgender women, hormonal birth control, and other uses. Transdermal preparations of estrogen are metabolized differently than oral preparations. Transdermal estrogens avoid the first pass through the liver and thus potentially reduce the risk of blood clotting and stroke.

An estrogen patch is applied directly to the skin, preferably near the lower abdomen, hips, or buttocks, and is usually changed once or twice per week. For women who have not undergone a hysterectomy, it is often suggested that they take progestogen in addition to an estrogen patch in order to protect the endometrium of the uterus. Transdermal estrogens are not recommended for all women; there are important precautions and side effects that should be considered before use.

== Medical uses ==
Available transdermal estradiol patches in the United States (Note: Specific links for each patch's FDA approval and label are not given.)
Brand name	Dose (µg/day)	DOA (d)	Size (Note: For comparison, a United States quarter is about 4.6 cm^{2} (0.72 in^{2}).) (Note: Sizes are respective to the dosages in the dose column.) (cm^{2})	Levels (pg/mL)	Intro.
Alora	25, 50, 75, 100	3–4	9, 18, 27, 36	43–144	1996
Climara (Note: Generic version available.)	25, 37.5, 50, 60, 75, 100	7	6.5, 9.375, 12.5, 15, 18.75, 25	17–174	1994
Climara Pro (Note: Combined with a progestin.)	E2 (45); LNG (15)	7	22	27–54	2003
CombiPatch	E2 (50); NETA (14, 25)	3–4	9, 16	27–71	1998
Menostar	14	7	3.25	13–21	2004
Minivelle	25, 37.5, 50, 75, 100	3–4	1.65, 2.48, 3.3, 4.95, 6.6	30–117	2012
Vivelle	50, 100	3–4	14.5, 29	30–145	2000
Vivelle-Dot	25, 37.5, 50, 75, 100	3–4	2.5, 3.75, 5, 7.5, 10	30–145	1996

=== Menopause ===
An estrogen patch may be recommended for women experiencing moderate to severe symptoms of menopause, such as vasomotor symptoms and vaginal atrophy. During menopause, the ovaries stop producing estrogen which causes estrogen levels to fall. The sudden change in estrogen levels may cause vasomotor symptoms, such as hot flashes. Research suggests that the estrogen patch can relieve both the frequency and severity of vasomotor symptoms by increasing estrogen levels. An estrogen patch may also be used to treat vulvar and vaginal atrophy, another symptom of menopause associated with the sudden change in estrogen levels.

=== Hypoestrogenism ===
Hypoestrogenism, or estrogen deficiency, may suggest menopause is approaching for middle aged women. Other causes of hypoestrogenism are excessive exercise, restrictive diet, underactive pituitary gland, ovarian failure, Turner Syndrome, and kidney disease. Symptoms of hypoestrogenism may include pain during sex, irregular periods, mood swings, hot flashes, breast tenderness, headache, depression, fatigue, weak bones, and an increase risk of urinary tract infections. Estrogen therapies, including the use of an estrogen patch, can be used to alleviate these symptoms by increasing estrogen levels to a normal state. Premenopausal women may be recommended to take progestin with estrogen therapy.

=== Prevention of osteoporosis ===
Estrogen patches may be effective in preventing osteoporosis in postmenopausal women. Research suggests that estrogen patches can significantly increases bone mineral density and reduce risks of fractures in postmenopausal women by raising estrogen levels and avoiding first-pass metabolism.

There is evidence that the combination of an estrogen patch with a progestin pill can improve bone mineral density in young, premenopausal amenorrheic athletes, and may be more effective than an oral estrogen with progestin.

=== Hormonal birth control ===
Contraceptive patches such as norelgestromin/ethinylestradiol are a form of estrogen patch which are used for hormonal birth control.

=== Feminizing hormone therapy ===
Estrogen patches are commonly used for feminizing hormone therapy for transgender women as part of gender-affirming care.

== Patches with progestogens ==
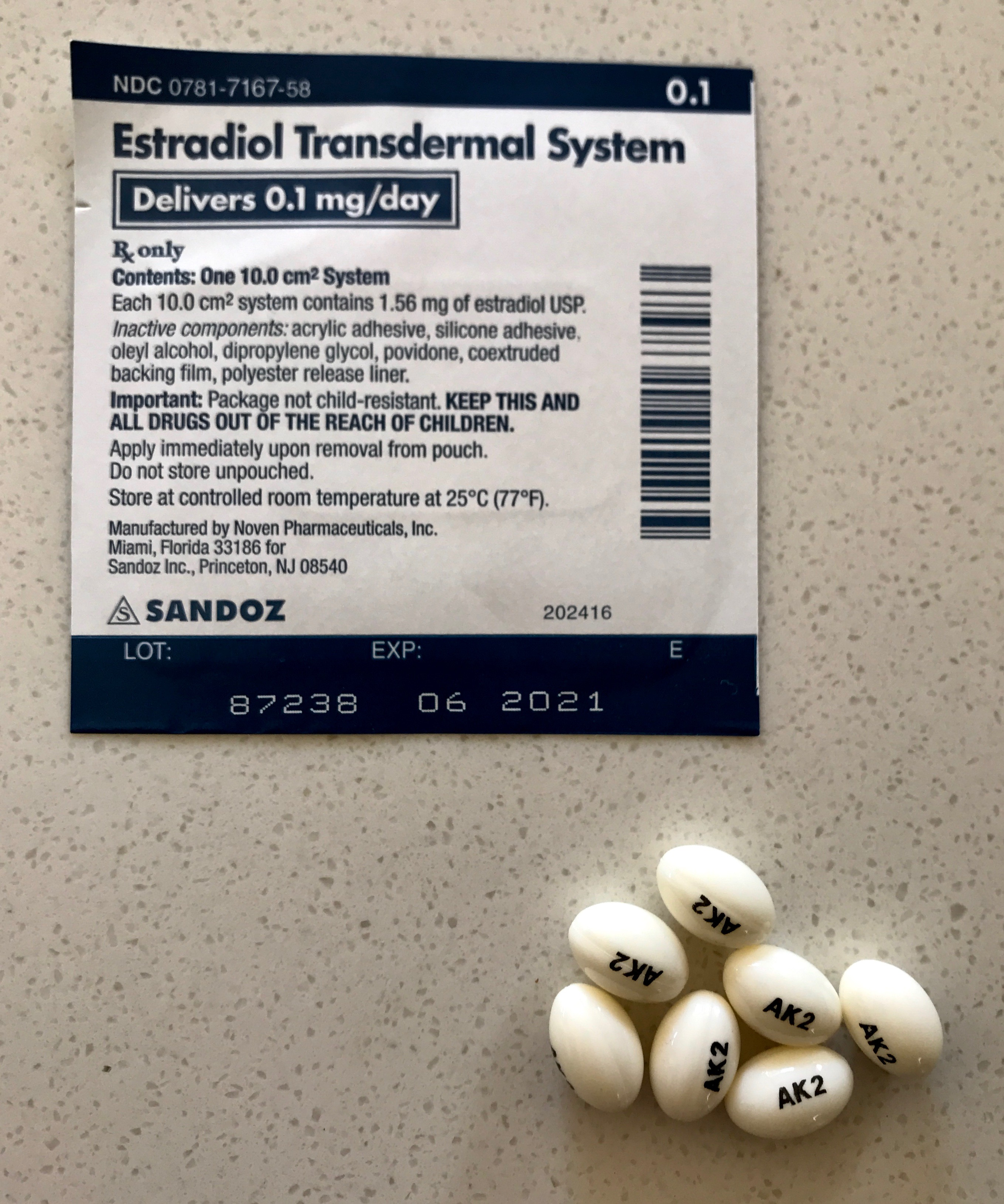
Sandoz Estradiol Transdermal System with oral progestin

Taking a progestogen in addition to an estrogen patch should be considered for women who have not undergone a hysterectomy to regulate the thickness of the endometrial lining and reduce the risk of endometrial cancer. Hysterectomized women rarely need a progestogen, however it may be considered if a history of endometriosis exists. There are different types of delivery systems of progestogens that can be used in addition to an estrogen patch, including pills, injections, and patches, among others.

Research has suggested that estrogen plus progestogen therapy may increase the risk of heart attacks, stroke, breast cancer, blot clots, and dementia in postmenopausal women. Taking the lowest effective dose of both estrogen and a progestogen may reduce risks.

== Administration ==
Depending on the brand, patches are applied to the skin once or twice weekly. Patches should be placed on clean skin where hair and moisture is not present. Preferred areas of application include lower abdomen, hip, and buttocks. Patches should never be applied to the breasts. To reduce the risk of the patch detaching from the skin and skin irritation, skin care products, sun exposure, damaged skin, and tight-fitting clothing should be avoided where the patch is placed.

== Side effects ==
Headache, breast pain or tenderness, nausea, vomiting, hair loss, vaginal discharge or irritation, and mood changes are some of the common side effects that may occur while using an estrogen patch. More serious side effects may include fever, loss of appetite, joint pain, difficulty breathing or swallowing, and yellowing of the skin or eyes.

Seeing a health professional regularly, taking progestin, having pelvic and breast exams, lowering blood pressure, and lowering cholesterol may reduce the likelihood of developing severe side effects while using an estrogen patch.

== Precautions ==
Women who have experienced vaginal bleeding post menopause, certain cancers, stroke, heart attack, blood clotting, or uncontrollable bleeding, and women who are pregnant or allergic to ingredients in estrogen patches should not use an estrogen patch as serious adverse effects may occur.

== Society and culture ==
=== Brand names ===
Estrogen patches are available in multiple brand names in different countries. Some patches are available with a progestin such as levonorgestrel, norethisterone acetate, or norelgestromin.

== See also ==
- Pharmacokinetics of estradiol § Transdermal administration
- Hormone replacement therapy
