= Relative energy deficiency in sport =

Syndrome of disordered eating, oligomenorrhoea and osteopenia

Symptoms of RED-S

Relative energy deficiency in sport (RED-S) is a syndrome in which disordered eating (or low energy availability), amenorrhoea/oligomenorrhoea (in women), and decreased bone mineral density (osteoporosis and osteopenia) are present. It is caused by eating too little food to support the amount of energy being expended by an athlete, often at the urging of a coach or other authority figure who believes that athletes are more likely to win competitions when they have an extremely lean body type. RED-S is a serious illness with lifelong health consequences and can potentially be fatal.

RED-S is the broader, more comprehensive name for what was formerly known as the female athlete triad (or simply the triad), which was a condition seen in females participating in sports that emphasize leanness or low body weight. As the non-menstrual components are also seen in males, the name was changed to the comprehensive term RED-S.

== Classification ==
Formerly known as the female athlete triad, RED-S is a syndrome of three interrelated conditions. Thus, if an athlete is suffering from one element of the triad, it is likely that they are suffering from the other two components of the triad as well.

With the increase in female participation in sports, the incidence of a triad of disorders particular to women—the female athlete triad—has also increased. The female athlete triad and its relationship with athletics was identified in the 1980s as the prevalence increased during this period, and symptoms, risk factors, causes, and treatments were studied in depth and their relatedness evaluated. The condition is most common in sports that emphasize leanness, such as cross country running, gymnastics, figure skating and ski jumping. Many of those who suffer from the triad are involved in some sort of athletics, in order to promote weight loss and leanness. The competitive sports that promote this physical leanness may result in disordered eating and be responsible for the origin of the female athlete triad.

For some women, the disorder can have major health consequences. In addition, for some competitive female athletes, problems such as low self-esteem, a tendency toward perfectionism, and family stress place them at risk for disordered eating.

== Signs and symptoms ==
Clinical symptoms of RED-S may include disordered eating, fatigue, hair loss, cold hands and feet, dry skin, noticeable weight loss, increased healing time from injuries (e.g., lingering bruises), increased incidence of bone fracture and cessation of menses. Affected athletes may also struggle with low self-esteem and depression.

Upon physical examination, a physician may also note the following symptoms: elevated carotene in the blood, anemia, orthostatic hypotension, electrolyte irregularities, hypoestrogenism, vaginal atrophy, and bradycardia.

An athlete may show signs of restrictive eating, but not meet the clinical criteria for an eating disorder. They may also display subtle menstrual disturbances, such as a change in menstrual cycle length, anovulation, or luteal phase defects, but not yet have developed complete amenorrhea. Likewise, an athlete's bone density may decrease, but may not yet have dropped below her age-matched normal range. These signs can be considered "occult," as no one symptom may be severe enough to seek medical attention, leaving the triad to go unnoticed or untreated. Although the larger scientific community has not agreed upon a clear recommendation for ideal energy intake, physicians may take note of female athletes consuming under 30 kcal per kilogram of fat free mass (FFM) per day.

=== Disordered eating ===
Energy availability is defined as energy intake minus energy expended. Energy is taken in through food consumption. Bodies expend energy through normal functioning as well as through exercise. In the case of RED-S, low energy availability may be due to eating disorders, but not necessarily so. Athletes may experience low energy availability by exercising more without a concomitant change in eating habits, or they may increase their energy expenditure while also eating less. Disordered eating is defined among this situation due to the low caloric intake or low energy availability.

While most athletes do not meet the clinical criteria to be diagnosed with an eating disorder such as anorexia nervosa or bulimia nervosa, many still exhibit subclinical disordered eating, along with general psychopathology associated with eating disorders (anxiety, depression, obsessive-compulsive symptoms. Particularly, excessive fasting and avoidance of certain types of food (such as foods containing fat) arise commonly in athletes. Especially in weight-class sports, leanness-dependent sports, and aesthetic sports, the prevalence of eating disorders soar much higher than the average population. In athletes that engage in such sports, the pressure to perform promotes excessive dieting and other disordered eating habits, as athletes try to conform to expected weight patterns.

More severe examples of disordered eating habits may include binge-eating; purging; and the use of diet-pills, laxatives, diuretics, and enemas.

By restricting their diet, the athlete may worsen their problem of low energy availability. Having low dietary energy from excessive exercise or dietary restrictions leaves too little energy for the body to carry out normal functions such as maintaining a regular menstrual cycle or healthy bone density.

=== Amenorrhea ===
Amenorrhea, defined as the cessation of the menstrual cycle for more than three months, is the second disorder in the triad. Weight fluctuations from dietary restrictions and/or excessive exercise affect the hypothalamus' output of gonadotropic hormones. Gonadotropic hormones "stimulate growth of the gonads and the secretion of sex hormones", (e.g. gonadotropin-releasing hormone, lutenizing hormone and follicle stimulating hormone). These gonadotropic hormones play a role in stimulating estrogen release from the ovaries. Without estrogen release, the menstrual cycle is disrupted. Exercising intensely and not eating enough calories can lead to decreases in estrogen, the hormone that helps to regulate the menstrual cycle. As a result, periods may become irregular or stop altogether.

There are two types of amenorrhea. A person who has been having her period and then stops menstruating for ninety days or more is said to have secondary amenorrhea. In the case of RED-S, the majority of secondary amenorrhea cases are attributed to functional hypothalamic amenorrhea (FHA), an adaptive mechanism to preserve energy for survival and vital processes rather than reproduction when energy balance is low. Primary amenorrhea is characterized by delayed menarche (the onset of menses during puberty). Delayed menarche may be associated with delay of the development of secondary sexual characteristics.

=== Osteoporosis ===
Osteoporosis is defined by the National Institutes of Health as a skeletal disorder characterized by compromised bone strength predisposing a person to an increased risk of fracture. Low estrogen levels and poor nutrition, especially low calcium intake, can lead to osteoporosis, the third aspect of the triad. This condition can ruin an athlete's career because it may lead to stress fractures and other injuries.

Patients with RED-S get osteoporosis due to hypoestrogenemia, or low estrogen levels. With estrogen deficiency, the osteoclasts live longer and are therefore able to resorb more bone. In response to the increased bone resorption, there is increased bone formation and a high-turnover state develops which leads to bone loss and perforation of the trabecular plates. As osteoclasts break down bone, patients see a loss of bone mineral density (BMD). Low BMD renders bones more brittle and hence susceptible to fracture. Because athletes are active and their bones must endure mechanical stress, the likelihood of experiencing bone fracture is particularly high.

Additionally, because those suffering with RED-S are also restricting their diet, they may also not be consuming sufficient amounts vitamins and minerals which contribute to bone density; not getting enough calcium or vitamin D further exacerbates the problem of weak bones.

Bone mass is now thought to peak between the ages of 18 and 25. Thus, behaviors which result in low bone density in youth could be detrimental to an athlete's bone health throughout their lifetime.

In addition, ovulation is the primary way that females create the hormone progesterone. When an ovum is released from the ovary, the structure that remains develops into the corpus luteum. The corpus luteum emits the hormone progesterone during the 10–16 days of the luteal phase. Without experiencing regular, ovulatory menstrual cycles, the female is not secreting the hormone progesterone during the luteal phase of her cycle. Progesterone directly stimulates osteoblasts to make new bone. Therefore, if the woman is not ovulating, she is not creating progesterone, and misses out on this opportunity to stimulate new bone growth.

== Causes ==
Gymnastics, figure skating, diving, swimming, long-distance running, as well as ballet are examples of activities which emphasize low body weight. The triad is seen more often in aesthetic sports such as these versus ball game sports. People taking part in these sports may be at an increased risk for developing RED-S.

Athletes at greatest risk for low energy availability are those who restrict dietary energy intake, who exercise for prolonged periods, who are vegetarian, and who limit the types of food they will eat. Many factors appear to contribute to disordered eating behaviors and clinical eating disorders. Dieting is a common entry point and interest has focused on the contribution of environmental and social factors, psychological predisposition, low self-esteem, family dysfunction, abuse, biological factors, and genetics. In some cases, financial hardship and food insecurity produce disordered eating habits. Additional factors for athletes include early start of sport-specific training and dieting, injury, and a sudden increase in training volume. Surveys show more negative eating attitude scores in athletic disciplines favoring leanness. Disordered eating behaviors are risk factors for eating disorders.

== Treatment ==
The underlying cause of the RED-S is an imbalance between energy taken into the body (through nutrition) and energy used by the body (through exercise). The treatment includes correcting this imbalance by either increasing calories in a diet or by decreasing calories burned by exercise for 12 months or longer. Typically, it is recommended that athletes increase their consumption of calories by 300–600 kcal per day in the early stages of treatment, but there is no standard when it comes to increasing calories over time. Part of the treatment includes an assessment that determines the cause of low energy availability, as treatment needs to be specialized based on the presence of disordered eating or an eating disorder. Persons with RED-S should get treatment from a multi-disciplinary team that includes a physician, dietitian, and mental health counselor, and seek support from family, friends, and their coach. It is important that physicians are aware of the signs of refeeding syndrome, as this can be life-threatening if not detected early.

Because a symptom of the RED-S is menstrual dysfunction, some physicians may recommend oral contraceptives because those pills will regulate the menstrual cycle. However, the underlying cause of the menstrual disorder is an energy imbalance, and using pills to regulate the menstrual cycle without changes in diet and behavior is likely to mask the food deficiency and delay appropriate treatment. A menstruating person taking contraceptives to treat menstrual dysfunction without correcting this energy imbalance will continue to lose bone density. Bone density should be measured using dual-energy X-ray absorpitiometry (DEXA) to determine severity of bone loss, especially if there is an absence of menstruation.

=== Decreasing energy expenditure ===
Continued participation in training and competition depends on the physical and mental health of the athlete. Athletes who weigh less than 80 percent of their ideal body weight may not be able to safely participate.

Persons with RED-S are often asked by health care providers to reduce the amount of time they spend exercising by 10–12 percent.

=== Increasing energy intake ===
Low energy availability with or without eating disorders, functional hypothalamic amenorrhea, and osteoporosis, alone or in combination, pose significant health risks to physically active girls and women. Prevention, recognition, and treatment of these clinical conditions should be a priority of those who work with female athletes to ensure that they maximize the benefits of regular exercise.

Patients are recommended to work with a dietician who can monitor their nutritional status and help the patient work towards a healthy goal weight. Patients should also meet with a psychiatrist or psychologist to address the psychological aspects of the triad. Therefore, it is important that trainers and coaches are made aware of the athlete's condition and be part of her recovery.

=== Medicine ===
Patients are also sometimes treated pharmacologically. To both induce menses and improve bone density, doctors may prescribe cyclic estrogen or progesterone as is used to treat post-menopausal women. Patients may also be put on oral contraceptives to stimulate regular periods. In addition to hormone therapy, nutrition supplements may be recommended. Doctors may prescribe calcium supplements. Vitamin D supplements may be also used because this vitamin aids in calcium absorption. Bisphosphonates and calcitonin, used to treat adults with osteoporosis, may be prescribed, although their effectiveness in adolescents has not yet been established. Finally, if indicated by a psychiatric examination, the affected athlete may be prescribed anti-depressants and in some cases benzodiazepines to help in alleviating severe distress at mealtimes.

=== Psychological treatment ===
Although relative energy deficiency in sport is often regarded as a physiological issue, it can have psychological impacts in the process of treatment and psychological stress may contribute to the development of RED-S, as athletes may use excessive exercise and decreased energy consumption as a means to manage stress levels. Many athletes strive for perfection and this can exacerbate mental stress as well as put athletes at a greater risk for developing an eating disorder. The main reasons why athletes would be resistant to treatment for RED-S is due to psychological factors. A mental health counselor who is experienced in eating disorders should provide treatment. If there are other comorbid psychological disorders, such as depression and anxiety, a risk of self harm, medical complications and lack of progress in an outpatient level of care, the person struggling with RED-S may need more intensive care at an inpatient, residential, partial hospitalization or intensive outpatient level. At each level of care, treatment modalities include cognitive-behavioral therapy, dialectical behavioral therapy or family-based therapy.

== Prognosis ==
Sustained low energy availability, with or without disordered eating, can impair health. Psychological problems associated with eating disorders include low self-esteem, depression, and anxiety disorders. Medical complications involve the cardiovascular, endocrine, reproductive, skeletal, gastrointestinal, renal, and central nervous systems. The prognosis for anorexia nervosa is grave with a six-fold increase in standard mortality rates compared to the general population. In one study, 5.4% of athletes with eating disorders reported suicide attempts. Although 83% of anorexia nervosa patients partially recover, the rate of sustained recovery of weight, menstrual function and eating behavior is only 33%.

Amenorrheic women can be infertile, due to the absence of ovarian follicular development, ovulation, and luteal function. Consequences of hypoestrogenism seen in amenorrheic athletes include impaired endothelium-dependent arterial vasodilation, which reduces the perfusion of working muscle, impaired skeletal muscle oxidative metabolism, elevated low-density lipoprotein cholesterol levels, and vaginal dryness.

Due to low bone mineral density that declines as the number of missed menstrual cycles accumulates, and the loss of BMD which may not be fully reversible, stress fractures occur more commonly in physically active women with menstrual irregularities and/or low BMD. Amenhorrheic athletes have a relative risk for stress fracture two to four times greater than eumenorrheic athletes. Fractures also occur in the setting of nutritional deficits and low BMD.

== Society and culture ==
The American Academy of Pediatrics and the AAFP contend that exercise is important and should be promoted in girls for health and enjoyment; however, pediatricians should be wary of health problems that may occur in female athletes.

Coaches are discouraged from active participation in the treatment of eating disorders. In addition to conflicts of interest, coaches may be perceived to pressure athletes and potentially perpetuate components of RED-S. For example, in maintaining a place on the team or continued scholarship support, a female athlete may feel compelled to overtrain or restrict eating.

=== Male athletes ===
Relative energy deficiency in sport is also common among male athletes, especially those in sports that encourage weight-cycling and low weight. There is currently insufficient empirical data available on RED-S in this population. The risk of RED-S is heightened in ski jumping, "road cyclists, rowers (lightweight and open weight), athletes in combat sports, distance runners, and jockeys."

Male athletes who undergo long periods of low energy availability experience decreased androgen levels, bone mineral density, and overall strength. They also experience increases in cardiovascular disease, prevalence of bone fractures and mood disorders. Both male and female athletes are recommended treatment plans that focus on decreasing energy expenditure, increasing energy intake in addition to pharmacological and psychological treatment.

== See also ==
- Body dysmorphic disorder
- Gonadotropin
- List of medical triads, tetrads, and pentads
