= Amenorrhea =

Absence of a menstrual period in a woman of reproductive age

- Other names: Amenorrhea, amenorrhœa
- Specialty: Gynecology

Amenorrhea or amenorrhoea is the absence of a menstrual period in a female organism which has reached reproductive age. Physiological states of amenorrhea are most commonly seen during pregnancy and lactation (breastfeeding). In humans, it is where a woman or girl who has reached reproductive age and who is not on birth control does not menstruate.

Amenorrhea is a symptom with many potential causes. Primary amenorrhea is defined as an absence of secondary sexual characteristics by age 13 with no menarche or normal secondary sexual characteristics but no menarche by 15 years of age. It may be caused by developmental problems, such as the congenital absence of the uterus, failure of the ovary to receive or maintain egg cells, or delay in pubertal development. Secondary amenorrhea, ceasing of menstrual cycles after menarche, is defined as the absence of menses for three months in a woman with previously normal menstruation, or six months for women with a history of oligomenorrhea. It is often caused by hormonal disturbances from the hypothalamus and the pituitary gland, premature menopause, intrauterine scar formation, or eating disorders.

== Pathophysiology ==
Although amenorrhea has multiple potential causes, ultimately, it is the result of a hormonal imbalance or an anatomical abnormality.

Physiologically, menstruation is controlled by the release of gonadotropin-releasing hormone (GnRH) from the hypothalamus. GnRH acts on the pituitary to stimulate the release of follicle stimulating hormone (FSH) and luteinizing hormone (LH). FSH and LH then act on the ovaries to stimulate the production of estrogen and progesterone which, respectively, control the proliferative and secretory phases of the menstrual cycle. Prolactin also influences the menstrual cycle as it suppresses the release of LH and FSH from the pituitary. Similarly, thyroid hormone also affects the menstrual cycle. Low levels of thyroid hormone stimulate the release of TRH from the hypothalamus, which in turn increases both TSH and prolactin release. This increase in prolactin suppresses the release of LH and FSH through a negative feedback mechanism. Amenorrhea can be caused by any mechanism that disrupts this hypothalamic-pituitary-ovarian axis, whether that it be by hormonal imbalance or by disruption of feedback mechanisms.

== Classification ==
Amenorrhea is classified as either primary or secondary.

=== Primary amenorrhea ===
Primary amenorrhea is the absence of menstruation in a woman by the age of 16. Females who have not reached menarche at 14 and who have no signs of secondary sexual characteristics (thelarche or pubarche) are also considered to have primary amenorrhea. Examples of amenorrhea include constitutional delay of puberty, Turner syndrome, and Mayer–Rokitansky–Küster–Hauser (MRKH) syndrome.

It produces the appearance of secondary sexual characteristics, which are the sprouting of pubic and armpit hair, development of the breasts, and a lack of definition in the female body structure, such as the waist and hips.

=== Secondary amenorrhea ===
Secondary amenorrhea is defined as the absence of menstruation for three months in a woman with a history of regular cyclic bleeding or six months in a woman with a history of irregular menstrual periods. Examples of conditions which may cause of contribute to secondary amenorrhea include hypothyroidism, hyperthyroidism, hyperprolactinaemia, polyendocrine metabolic ovarian syndrome (PMOS), primary ovarian insufficiency, and functional hypothalamic amenorrhea.

== Causes ==
=== Primary amenorrhea ===
==== Turner syndrome ====
Turner syndrome, monosomy 45XO, is a genetic disorder characterized by a missing, or partially missing, X chromosome. Turner syndrome is associated with a wide spectrum of features that vary with each case. However, one common feature of this syndrome is ovarian insufficiency due to gonadal dysgenesis. Most people with Turner syndrome experience ovarian insufficiency within the first few years of life, before menarche. Therefore, most patients with Turner syndrome will have primary amenorrhea. However, the incidence of spontaneous puberty varies between 8–40% depending on whether or not there is a complete or partial absence of the X chromosome.

==== MRKH ====
MRKH (Mayer–Rokitansky–Küster–Hauser) syndrome is the second-most common cause of primary amenorrhea. The syndrome is characterized by Müllerian agenesis. In MRKH Syndrome, the Müllerian ducts develop abnormally and result in the absence of a uterus and cervix. Even though patients with MRKH have functioning ovaries and therefore have secondary sexual characteristics, they experience primary amenorrhea since there is no functioning uterus.

==== Other intersex conditions ====
Individuals with a female phenotype can present with primary amenorrhea due to complete androgen insensitivity syndrome (CAIS), 5-alpha-reductase 2 deficiency, pure gonadal dysgenesis, 17β-hydroxysteroid dehydrogenase deficiency, and mixed gonadal dysgenesis.

==== Constitutional delay of puberty ====
Constitutional delay of puberty is a diagnosis of exclusion that is made when the workup for primary amenorrhea does not reveal another cause. Constitutional delay of puberty is not due to a pathologic cause. It is considered a variant of the timeline of puberty. Although more common in boys, girls with delayed puberty present with the onset of secondary sexual characteristics after the age of 14, as well as menarche after the age of 16. This may be due to genetics, as some cases of constitutional delay of puberty are familial.

=== Secondary amenorrhea ===
==== Breastfeeding ====
Physiologic amenorrhea is present before menarche, during pregnancy and breastfeeding, and after menopause.

Breastfeeding or lactational amenorrhea is also a common cause of secondary amenorrhea. Lactational amenorrhea is due to the presence of elevated prolactin and low levels of LH, which suppress ovarian hormone secretion. Breastfeeding typically prolongs postpartum lactational amenorrhea, and the duration of amenorrhea varies depending on how often a woman breastfeeds. Due to this reason, breastfeeding has been advocated as a method of family planning, especially in developing countries where access to other methods of contraception may be limited.

==== Diseases of the thyroid ====
Disturbances in thyroid hormone regulation have been a known cause of menstrual irregularities, including secondary amenorrhea.

Patients with hypothyroidism frequently present with changes in their menstrual cycle. It is hypothesized that this is due to increased TRH, which goes on to stimulate the release of both TSH and prolactin. Increased prolactin inhibits the release of LH and FSH, which are needed for ovulation to occur.

Patients with hyperthyroidism may also present with oligomenorrhea or amenorrhea. Sex hormone binding globulin is increased in hyperthyroid states. This, in turn, increases the total levels of testosterone and estradiol. Increased levels of LH and FSH have also been reported in patients with hyperthyroidism.

==== Hypothalamic and pituitary causes ====
Changes in the hypothalamic-pituitary axis is a common cause of secondary amenorrhea. GnRH is released from the hypothalamus and stimulates the anterior pituitary to release FSH and LH, which in turn stimulate the ovaries to release estrogen and progesterone. Any pathology in the hypothalamus or pituitary can alter the way this feedback mechanism works and can cause secondary amenorrhea.

Pituitary adenomas are a common cause of amenorrhea. Prolactin secreting pituitary adenomas cause amenorrhea due to the hyper-secretion of prolactin which inhibits FSH and LH release. Other space-occupying pituitary lesions can also cause amenorrhea due to the inhibition of dopamine, an inhibitor of prolactin, due to compression of the pituitary gland.

==== Polyendocrine metabolic ovarian syndrome (PMOS) ====
Polyendocrine metabolic ovarian syndrome (PMOS) is a common endocrine disorder affecting 4–8% of women worldwide. It is characterized by multiple cysts on the ovary, amenorrhea or oligomenorrhea, and increased androgens. Although the exact cause remains unknown, it is hypothesized that increased levels of circulating androgens is what results in secondary amenorrhea. PMOS may also be a cause of primary amenorrhea if androgen access is present prior to menarche. Although multiple cysts on the ovary are characteristic of the syndrome, this has not been noted to be a cause of the disease.

==== Low body weight ====
Women who perform excessive exercise regularly or lose a significant amount of weight are at risk of developing hypothalamic amenorrhea or exercise amenorrhea. Functional hypothalamic amenorrhea (FHA) can be caused by stress, weight loss, or excessive exercise. Many women who diet or who exercise at a high level do not take in enough calories to maintain their normal menstrual cycles. The threshold of developing amenorrhea appears to be dependent on low energy availability rather than absolute weight because a critical minimum amount of stored, easily mobilized energy is necessary to maintain regular menstrual cycles. Amenorrhea is often associated with anorexia nervosa and other eating disorders. Relative energy deficiency in sport, also known as the female athlete triad, is when a woman experiences amenorrhea, disordered eating, and osteoporosis.

Energy imbalance and weight loss can disrupt menstrual cycles through several hormonal mechanisms. Weight loss can cause elevations in the hormone ghrelin which inhibits the hypothalamic-pituitary-ovarial axis. Elevated concentrations of ghrelin alter the amplitude of GnRH pulses, which causes diminished pituitary release of LH and follicle-stimulating hormone (FSH). Low levels of the hormone leptin are also seen in females with low body weight. Like ghrelin, leptin signals energy balance and fat stores to the reproductive axis. Decreased levels of leptin are closely related to low levels of body fat and correlate with a slowing of GnRH pulsing.

==== Drug-induced ====
Certain medications, particularly contraceptive medications, can induce amenorrhea in a healthy woman. The lack of menstruation usually begins shortly after beginning the medication and can take up to a year to resume after stopping its use. Hormonal contraceptives that contain only progestogen, like the oral contraceptive Micronor, and especially higher-dose formulations, such as the injectable Depo-Provera, commonly induce this side effect. Extended cycle use of combined hormonal contraceptives also allow suppression of menstruation. Patients who stop using combined oral contraceptive pills (COCP) may experience secondary amenorrhea as a withdrawal symptom. The link is not well understood, as studies have found no difference in hormone levels between women who develop amenorrhea as a withdrawal symptom following the cessation of COCP use and women who experience secondary amenorrhea because of other reasons. New contraceptive pills which do not have the normal seven days of placebo pills in each cycle, have been shown to increase rates of amenorrhea in women. Studies show that women are most likely to experience amenorrhea after one year of treatment with continuous OCP use.

The use of opiates (such as heroin) regularly has also been known to cause amenorrhea in long-term users.

Anti-psychotic drugs, which are commonly used to treat schizophrenia, have been known to cause amenorrhea as well. Research suggests that anti-psychotic medications affect levels of prolactin, insulin, FSH, LH, and testosterone. Recent research suggests that adding a dosage of metformin to an anti-psychotic drug regimen can restore menstruation. Metformin has been shown to decrease resistance to the hormone insulin, as well as levels of prolactin, testosterone, and luteinizing hormone (LH).

==== Primary ovarian insufficiency ====
Primary ovarian insufficiency (POI) affects 1% of females and is defined as the loss of ovarian function before the age of 40. Although the cause of POI can vary, it has been linked to chromosomal abnormalities, chemotherapy, and autoimmune conditions. Hormone levels in POI are similar to menopause and are categorized by low estradiol and high levels of gonadotropins. Since the pathogenesis of POI involves the depletion of ovarian reserve, restoration of menstrual cycles typically does not occur in this form of secondary amenorrhea.

== Diagnosis ==
=== Primary amenorrhea ===
Primary amenorrhea can be diagnosed in female children by age 14 if no secondary sex characteristics, such as enlarged breasts and body hair, are present. In the absence of secondary sex characteristics, the most common cause of amenorrhea is low levels of FSH and LH caused by a delay in puberty. Gonadal dysgenesis, often associated with Turner syndrome, or premature ovarian failure may also be to blame. If secondary sex characteristics are present, but menstruation is not, primary amenorrhea can be diagnosed by age 16.

Evaluation of primary amenorrhea begins with a pregnancy test, prolactin, FSH, LH, and TSH levels. Abnormal TSH levels prompt evaluation for hyper- and hypo-thyroidism with additional thyroid function tests. Elevated prolactin levels prompt evaluation of the pituitary with an MRI to assess for any masses or malignancies. A pelvic ultrasound can also be obtained in the initial evaluation. If a uterus is not present on ultrasound, karyotype analysis and testosterone levels are obtained to assess for MRKH or androgen insensitivity syndrome. If a uterus is present, LH and FSH levels are used to make a diagnosis. Low levels of LH and FSH suggest delayed puberty or functional hypothalamic amenorrhea. Elevated levels of FSH and LH suggest primary ovarian insufficiency, typically due to Turner syndrome. Normal levels of FSH and LH can suggest an anatomical outflow obstruction.

=== Secondary amenorrhea ===
Secondary amenorrhea's most common and most easily diagnosable causes are pregnancy, thyroid disease, and hyperprolactinemia. A pregnancy test is a common first step for diagnosis.

Similar to primary amenorrhea, evaluation of secondary amenorrhea also begins with a pregnancy test, prolactin, FSH, LH, and TSH levels. A pelvic ultrasound is also obtained. Abnormal TSH should prompt a thyroid workup with a full thyroid function test panel. Elevated prolactin should be followed with an MRI to look for masses. If LH and FSH are elevated, menopause or primary ovarian insufficiency should be considered. Normal or low levels of FSH and LH prompt further evaluation with patient history and the physical exam. Testosterone, DHEA-S, and 17-hydroxyprogesterone levels should be obtained if there is evidence of excess androgens, such as hirsutism or acne. 17-hydroxyprogesterone is elevated in congenital adrenal hyperplasia. Elevated testosterone and amenorrhea can suggest polyendocrine metabolic ovarian syndrome (PMOS). Elevated androgens can also be present in ovarian or adrenal tumors, so additional imaging may also be needed. History of disordered eating or excessive exercise should raise concern for hypothalamic amenorrhea. Headache, vomiting, and vision changes can be signs of a tumor and needs evaluation with MRI. Finally, a history of gynecologic procedures should lead to evaluation of Asherman syndrome with a hysteroscopy or progesterone withdrawal bleeding test.

== Treatment ==
Treatment for amenorrhea varies based on the underlying condition. Treatment not only focuses on restoring menstruation, if possible, but also preventing additional complications associated with the underlying cause of amenorrhea.

=== Primary amenorrhea ===
In primary amenorrhea, the goal is to continue pubertal development, if possible. For example, most patients with Turner syndrome will be infertile due to gonadal dysgenesis. However, patients are frequently prescribed growth hormone therapy and estrogen supplementation to achieve taller stature and prevent osteoporosis. In other cases, such as MRKH, hormones do not need to be prescribed since the ovaries are able to function normally. Patients with constitutional delay of puberty may be monitored by an endocrinologist, but definitive treatment may not be needed as there will eventually be progression to normal puberty.

=== Secondary amenorrhea ===
Treatment for secondary amenorrhea varies greatly based on the root cause. Functional hypothalamic amenorrhea is typically treated by weight gain through increased calorie intake and decreased expenditure. Multidisciplinary treatment with monitoring from a physician, dietitian, and mental health counselor is recommended, along with support from family, friends, and coaches. Although oral contraceptives can cause menses to return, oral contraceptives should not be the initial treatment as they can mask the underlying problem and allow other effects of the eating disorder, like osteoporosis, to continue to develop.

Patients with hyperprolactinemia are often treated with dopamine agonists to reduce the levels of prolactin and restore menstruation. Surgery and radiation may also be considered if dopamine agonists, such as cabergoline and bromocriptine, are ineffective. Once prolactin levels are lowered, the resulting secondary amenorrhea is typically resolved. Similarly, treatment of thyroid abnormalities often resolves the associated amenorrhea. For example, administration of thyroxine in patients with low thyroid levels restored normal menstruation in a majority of patients.

Although there is currently no definitive treatment for polyendocrine metabolic ovarian syndrome (PMOS), various interventions are used to restore more frequent ovulation in patients. Weight loss and exercise have been associated with a return of ovulation in patients with PMOS due to normalization of androgen levels. Metformin has also been recently studied to regularize menstrual cycles in patients with PMOS. Although the exact mechanism remains unknown, it is hypothesized that this is due to metformin's ability to increase the body's sensitivity to insulin. Anti-androgen medications, such as spironolactone, can also be used to lower body androgen levels and restore menstruation. Oral contraceptive pills are also often prescribed to patients with secondary amenorrhea due to PMOS to regularize the menstrual cycle, although this is due to the suppression of ovulation.
