= Polyendocrine metabolic ovarian syndrome =

Hormonal disorder in women

- Other names: Polycystic ovary syndrome, Hyperandrogenic anovulation (HA), Stein–Leventhal syndrome
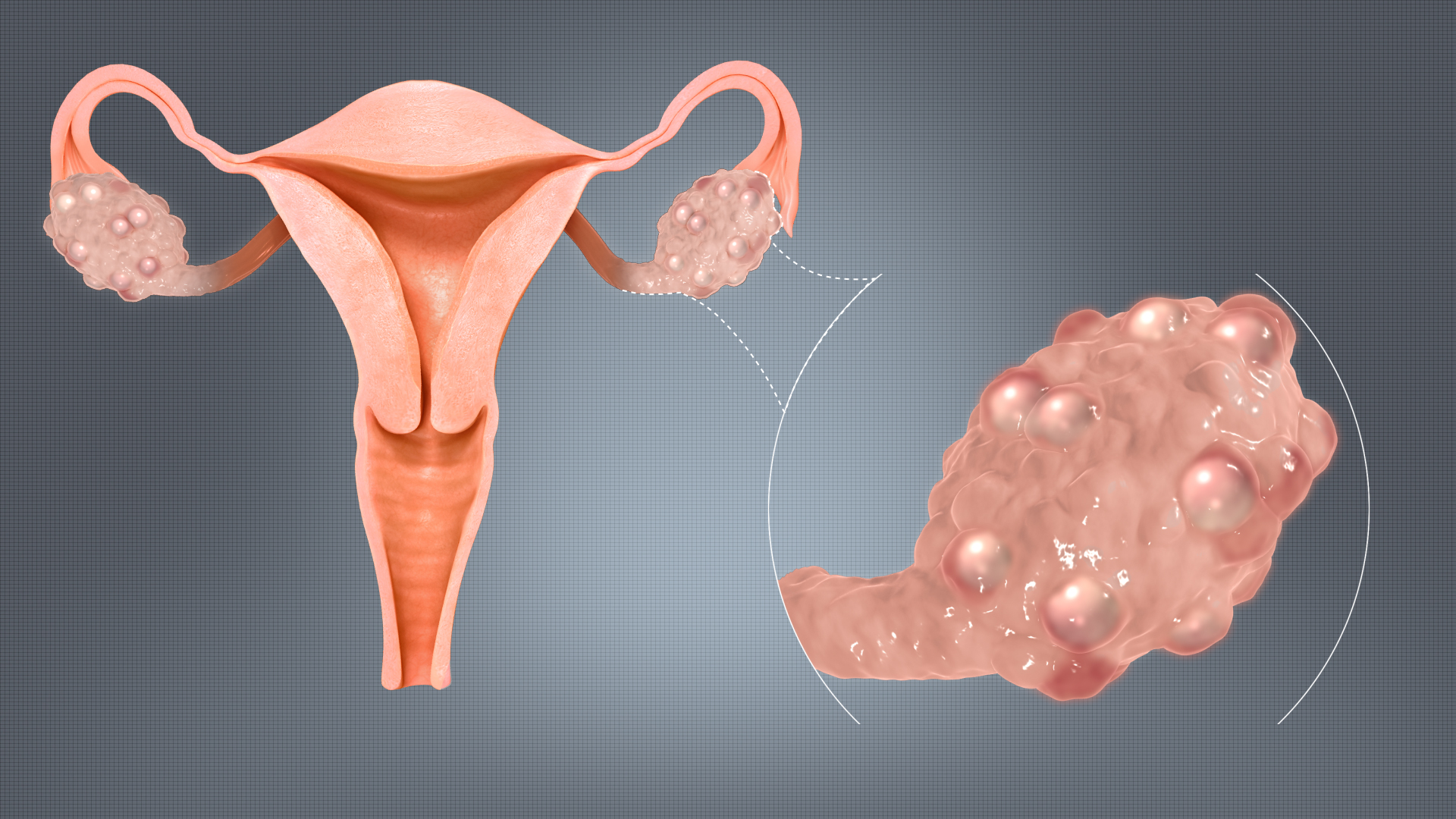
- Polycystic ovaries
- Specialty: Gynecology, endocrinology
- Symptoms: Irregular menstrual periods; heavy periods; excess hair; acne; difficulty getting pregnant; patches of thick, darker, velvety skin
- Complications: Type 2 diabetes, obesity, obstructive sleep apnea, heart disease, mood disorders, endometrial cancer
- Duration: Long term
- Causes: Genetic and environmental factors
- Risk factors: Family history, obesity
- Diagnostic method: Based on irregular periods, high androgen levels, ovarian cysts
- Differential diagnosis: Adrenal hyperplasia, hypothyroidism, high blood levels of prolactin
- Management: Healthy lifestyle, medication
- Medication: Birth control pills, metformin, antiandrogens, fertility treatments such as letrozole
- Frequency: 5–18% of women of childbearing age

Polyendocrine metabolic ovarian syndrome (PMOS), previously called polycystic ovary syndrome (PCOS), is the most common hormonal disorder in women of reproductive age. Diagnosis is based on at least two of the following three features: irregular menstrual periods, high testosterone or related symptoms (like excess facial hair), and an excess of antral ovarian follicles on ultrasound. Those with PMOS are not more likely than those without to have true ovarian cysts. A blood test for high levels of anti-Müllerian hormone can replace the ultrasound in the diagnosis. Other symptoms associated with PMOS are heavy periods, acne, difficulty getting pregnant, and patches of darker skin.

The exact cause of remains uncertain. There is a clear genetic component, but environmental factors are also thought to contribute. PMOS occurs in between 5% and 18% of women. The disorder is linked to insulin resistance, which is made worse by obesity. Insulin resistance and related excess insulin levels increase the risk of complications such as type 2 diabetes and liver disease. Those living with PMOS also have higher risk of endometrial cancer.

Management focuses on relieving symptoms and reducing long-term risks. A healthy lifestyle and weight control are recommended for general management. In addition, hormonal contraception can help regulate menstrual cycles and reduce acne and excess hair growth. Metformin, a common antidiabetic drug, increases insulin sensitivity. For fertility, ovulation can be induced with letrozole, among other methods. In addition, those affected can be monitored for cardiometabolic risks, and during pregnancy.

== Signs and symptoms ==
PMOS has a wide variety of signs and symptoms. They include issues with ovulation (such as irregular periods), excess levels of androgens (hormones that trigger male characteristics, such as facial hair growth), and metabolism (such as weight gain). Symptoms usually start in puberty, but may be masked if oral contraceptives are started early.

Common signs and symptoms of PMOS are:

- Irregular periods: periods may stop completely or may be less frequent. When they do happen, periods can be very heavy. There may be menstrual bleeding without ovulation, too; around 40% of women with PMOS who have a regular cycle have periods without ovulation.
- Infertility: PMOS is one of the leading causes of infertility in women.
- A male pattern of hair growth, including hair on the chin, upper lip, chest, upper thighs, and on the belly. This growth pattern, called hirsutism, is present in about 60% of women with PMOS.
- Acne: Acne is typically severe, persists beyond adolescence, or continues despite standard treatment.
- Pattern hair loss (androgenic alopecia), at the top of the scalp
- Skin issues, such as oily skin or a condition where dark, thick, and "velvety" patches can form (acanthosis nigricans)

The ovaries might be larger than normal, with many small fluid-filled sacs that surround eggs ("follicles"). Testosterone levels are usually elevated: one meta-analysis showed testosterone levels to be 1.5 times higher in women with PMOS compared to women without PMOS.

=== Associated conditions ===
Women with PMOS have an increased risk of a range of metabolic, cardiovascular, reproductive and mental health conditions. The likelihood of developing metabolic disorders is about three to seven times higher than in women without PMOS. Insulin resistance is common, even in lean women with PMOS. Overweight or obese women with PMOS are at higher risk of type 2 diabetes than women without PMOS at the same BMI. Lean women with PMOS do not appear to be at higher risk of developing diabetes. Other metabolic and cardiovascular complications commonly associated with PMOS include:

- Obesity: Across different cultures and ancestries, between 30% and 80% of women with PMOS are overweight or obese. There is marked weight gain between adolescence and adulthood, compared to those without PMOS.
- Dyslipidemia: disorders of fat (lipid) metabolism such as cholesterol and triglycerides: in PMOS, levels of low-density lipoprotein cholesterol are often high, while high-density cholesterol levels are low.
- Metabolic dysfunction–associated steatotic liver disease (MASLD; a chronic liver disease), particularly if androgen levels are high
- High blood pressure
- Metabolic syndrome, which occurs in about 40% of women with PMOS
- Cardiovascular disease: women with PMOS have about a two-fold increased risk of strokes and coronary heart disease compared to women without PMOS who have similar BMI.

PMOS increases the risk of pregnancy complications, such as gestational diabetes, high blood pressure, low blood sugar levels, and pre-eclampsia. Miscarriages are more likely, and when a baby is delivered, they are more likely to require admission to the neonatal intensive care unit.

PMOS is associated with mental health-related conditions including depression, anxiety, bipolar disorder, and obsessive–compulsive disorder. Those with PMOS often report reduced quality of life due to excess body weight, and to a lesser extent due to hirsutism, infertility and menstrual cycles. In regions where infertility or hirsutism are stigmatised, the impact on mental health is more severe. Body image can be negatively affected and PMOS increases the risk of eating disorders, such as binge eating. In addition, sexual wellbeing is often lower in women with PMOS.

Women with PMOS are about three times more likely to develop endometrial cancer. This is linked to lack of periods and lower levels of sex hormone-binding globulin (SHBG) and progesterone. Women with PMOS more often have sleep apnea, particularly if obesity is present.

== Cause ==
PMOS's root cause is unknown. Risk factors include a family history of PMOS, early development of pubic hair and sweat gland development (adrenarche), and obesity. Low birth weight, exposure to androgens in the womb, and exposure to hormone disruptors may also predispose people to PMOS.

=== Genetics ===
PMOS has a clear genetic component and high heritability. Evidence of the genetic basis comes from family and twin studies, as well as from large genome-wide association studies. The correlation in PMOS occurrence between identical twin sisters was found to be twice as high as that between non-identical twins, suggesting a significant genetic influence. Twenty-five different genetic loci have been found to correlate with PMOS in genome-wide association studies, of which thirteen were replicated in at least one other study. Variants in genes involved in insulin signaling and androgen synthesis, including those affecting ovarian steroidogenesis, have also been associated with increased susceptibility to PMOS. Genes near some of these loci imply neuroendocrine and metabolic dysfunction, but the role of other genes is not yet clear.

Men with a family history of PMOS also display some of the symptoms associated with it. For instance, brothers of women with PMOS show a higher likelihood of high AMH levels, insulin resistance, and abnormal lipid levels in the blood. Men with the genetic risk factors associated with PMOS also have higher levels of obesity, type-2 diabetes, male pattern hair loss, and cardiovascular disease. Not all similarities between family members are likely due to genetics, as PMOS and obesity in mothers can have an impact on fetal development, making it more likely for men to get metabolic disorders with age.

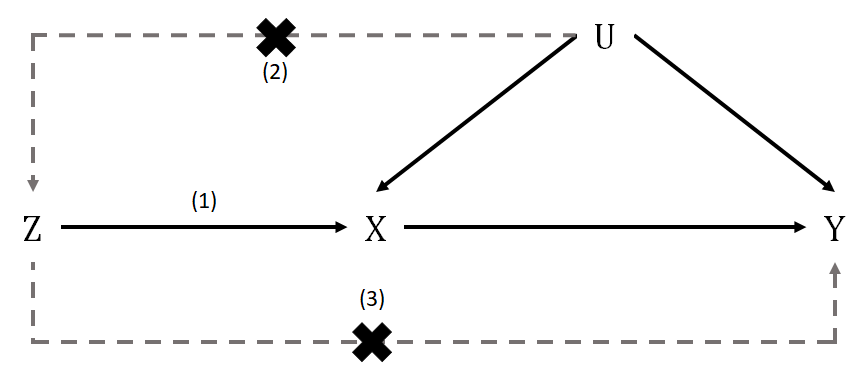
In Mendelian randomization, the question is whether exposure $X$ (e.g. obesity) causes outcome $Y$ (e.g. PMOS). The technique assumes that there are genetic variants $Z$ that increase the risk of the exposure, but do not directly impact the outcome, and are not impacted by a confounder $U$.

Mendelian randomization is a method in genetic epidemiology that seeks to identify causal relationships between risk factors and diseases. It uses the randomness of inheriting different genes to do so. Using Mendelian randomization, it was found that PMOS has causal links to sex hormone-binding globulin level, anti-Müllerian hormone (AMH) level, menopause age, body fat percentage, insulin resistance, depression, breast cancer, ovarian cancer, obsessive-compulsive disorder, and lung capacity. Other factors do not seem causally linked: anxiety disorder, schizophrenia, type 2 diabetes, coronary heart disease, stroke, or birth weight.

=== Environment ===
PMOS may also be impacted by epigenetics, which regulates how active genes are. High levels of androgens and AMH during pregnancy and early weight gain can hinder the fetal environment. In studies of PMOS in mice, exposure to AMH or the androgen dihydrotestosterone still has an effect three generations later. If that is so in humans, it implies that PMOS can be inherited via epigenetic changes. Blood in the umbilical cord of babies whose mothers have PMOS shows specific epigenetic changes suggestive of PMOS.

There is little evidence on the effect of environmental pollutants on PMOS risk. Hormone disruptors are chemicals that disturb the hormonal system by blocking or mimicking natural hormones. Of these, bisphenol A and phthalates (both used in plastics), and possibly octocrylene exposure may raise the risks of PMOS.

Obesity is implicated in PMOS development. As fat tissue can produce androgens, obesity leads to increased androgen levels. It also leads to suppression of the SHBG hormone, increased insulin resistance, and abnormally increased insulin levels. Some of the effects go both ways: PMOS might impact appetite, so that weight gain becomes more likely. Weight loss using diet is equally effective in people with and without PMOS.

== Mechanism ==
Hormonal disruption: Increased gonadotropin-releasing hormone (GnRH) pulse frequency raises levels of luteinizing hormone (LH), which stimulates ovarian follicles to produce more androgens. Excess androgens slow follicle development, leading to the accumulation of small follicles that produce anti-Müllerian hormone (AMH), increasing testosterone levels. Insulin resistance raises blood sugar and insulin levels, lowering sex hormone-binding globulin (SHBG), which further raises testosterone levels. Insulin also enhances the effect of LH on androgen production.

PMOS involves both hormonal and metabolic changes. Women with PMOS often have higher levels of androgens, mainly produced by the ovaries, as part of a disrupted hypothalamus–pituitary–ovarian axis. In the brain, the hypothalamus sends out gonadotropin-releasing hormone (GnRH) pulses with higher frequency. This raises luteinising hormone (LH), while follicle-stimulating hormone (FSH) stays the same or is slightly lower. The higher LH stimulates theca cells in the ovary to produce more androgens.

The disrupted hormonal environment, including high levels of androgens, suppresses the growth and development of ovarian follicles ("cysts"). This leads to an accumulation of many small follicles, a feature referred to as polycystic ovarian morphology. The lack of ovarian follicle development also leads to a reduction in ovulation. Granulosa cells in these small follicles produce high levels of anti-Müllerian hormone, which reduces the conversion of testosterone to oestradiol (oestrogen).

Metabolic changes are common in PMOS. Many women develop insulin resistance, which causes the pancreas to produce extra insulin. High insulin levels reduce liver production of sex hormone-binding globulin (SHBG), increasing free circulating androgens. Low-grade inflammation can worsen insulin resistance, creating a reinforcing loop between metabolic and reproductive disturbances. Insulin resistance is not present only in overweight women with PMOS, but obesity makes it worse.

PMOS is associated with cardiovascular and liver dysfunction. For instance, women with PMOS can have coronary and aortic calcification. Obesity, impaired glucose metabolism, and excess androgens are all risk factors for liver dysfunction (MASLD).

== Diagnosis ==
=== Diagnostic criteria ===
Different criteria are used for diagnosing PMOS, but the (revised) Rotterdam criteria are recommended by clinical guidelines. According to these criteria, an adult woman is diagnosed with PMOS if she meets two out of the following three:

1. Signs of androgen excess, either clinical (visible signs such as facial hair or acne) or biochemical (detected through a blood test). Androgens are "male" hormones like testosterone.
2. Irregular or absent menstrual cycles
3. Polycystic ovaries on ultrasound or high levels of anti-Müllerian hormone (AMH)

Other causes of these issues need to be excluded for diagnosis. In adolescents, both androgen excess and irregular or absent periods are required, as it is normal for adolescents to have many follicles ("cysts") visible in their ovaries, so it does not help with diagnosis. Adolescents who only meet one criterion are considered 'at risk', and are to be reassessed when they are adults.

Older criteria are the 1990 NIH criteria and the 2006 Androgen Excess Society criteria. The Androgen Excess Society criteria were never widely adopted. The old NIH criteria are stricter than the Rotterdam criteria, as both infrequent or irregular cycles and signs of androgen excess need to be present:

1. Infrequent or irregular cycles
2. Signs of androgen excess (clinical or biochemical)
3. Exclusion of other disorders that can result in the above

=== Assessment and testing ===
Steps to diagnose polycystic ovary syndrome in adults. In adolescents, only the first two steps are followed.

There is a three-step algorithm to diagnose PMOS. Step one assesses signs of androgen excess and irregular menstrual cycles. If someone has both, and other causes are excluded, PMOS is diagnosed. In step two, those with only irregular cycles undergo a blood test for testosterone. If elevated, again excluding other causes of the symptoms, PMOS is diagnosed. For adolescents, step two is the final step. Step three applies to adults with either irregular cycles or androgen excess. An ultrasound or AMH test (but not both, to avoid overdiagnosis) is performed. If polycystic ovaries or elevated AMH levels are detected, PMOS is diagnosed.

Clinical androgen excess in adults can result in acne, hirsutism (male pattern of hair growth, such as on the chin or chest), and female pattern hair loss. Hirsutism can be assessed using the standardised Ferriman–Gallwey visual scoring system, with a score above four to six indicating clinical significance. The recommended cut-off score depends on ethnicity, with a lower cut-off for Asian women, and a higher cut-off for Hispanic and Middle Eastern women. Assessment may be complicated by self-treatment. Hair loss can be assessed with the Ludwig visual score. In adolescents, androgen excess shows as severe acne and hirsutism.

The term "irregular menstrual cycle" refers not only to variation in frequency, length or flow, but also to cycle lengths that fall outside the normal range. Since irregularities in the menstrual cycle are normal shortly after menarche and during perimenopause, the age of the individual and the time since menarche need to be taken into account. Menstrual cycles are considered irregular in the following cases:

- Any single cycle is longer than 90 days, as long as the individual is at least one year post menarche.
- The cycle is generally shorter than 21 days or longer than 45 days, as long as the individual is at least one year post menarche.
- The cycle is generally longer than 35 days, as long as the individual is at least three years post menarche.
- Amenorrhea which is not due to another underlying cause, as long as the individual is at least 15 years old or at least 3 years post thelarche.

Biochemical androgen excess in PMOS is assessed using total and free testosterone. Accurate measurement requires tandem mass spectrometry assays, as direct free testosterone tests are not reliable. Interpretation is based on laboratory reference ranges. Hormonal contraception can interfere with hormone levels, so a withdrawal period of at least three months with alternative contraception may be needed. Severely elevated androgen levels may indicate other conditions.

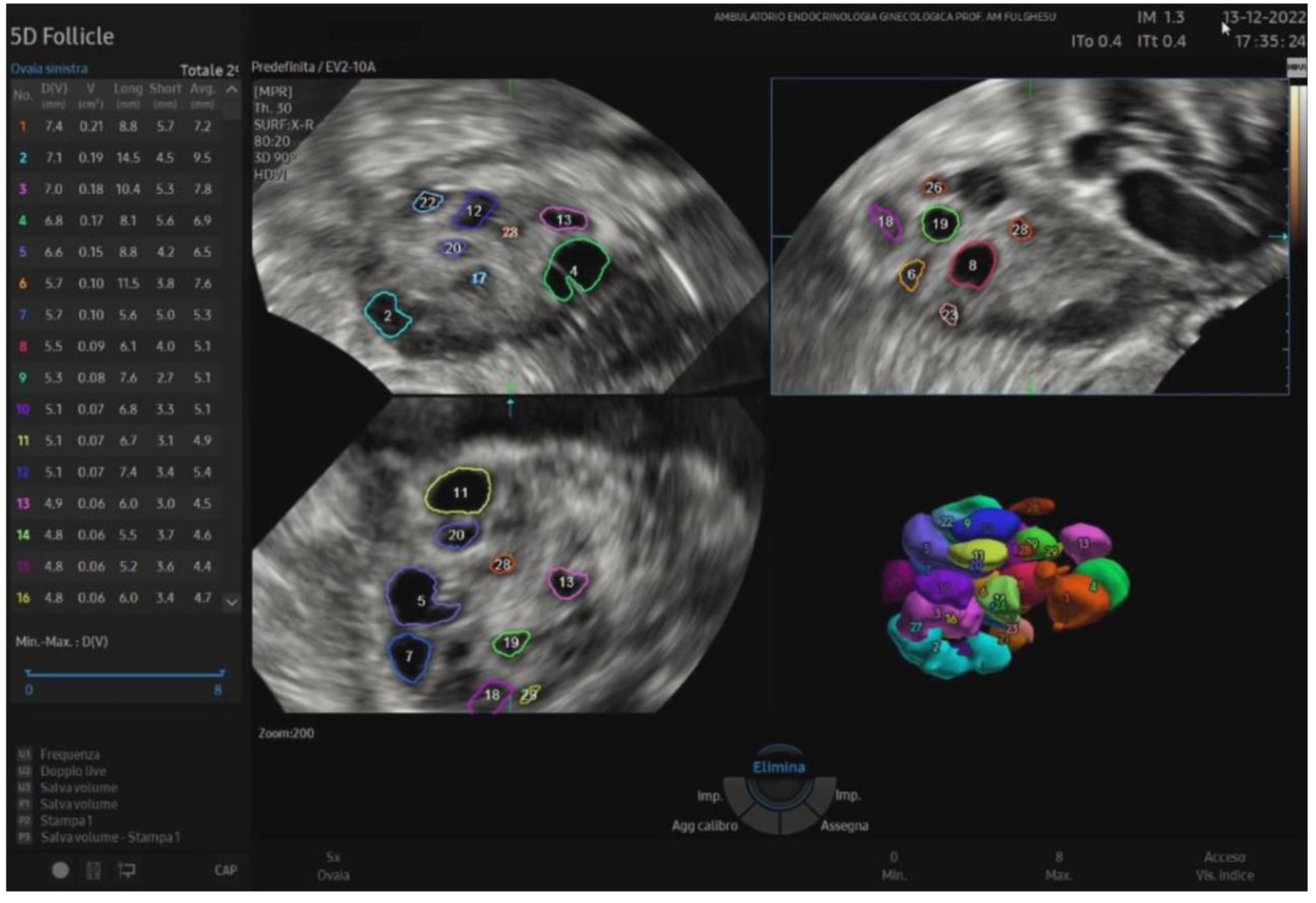
Ultrasound image showing polycystic ovary morphology

In adults, an ultrasound can be used to look for small ovarian follicles. In adolescents, this is not assessed because larger numbers of follicles are normal at that age. In PMOS, these follicles are often on the ovary's periphery, forming a "string of pearls". To count as polycystic ovaries, at least 20 follicles must be present, smaller than 9 mm. (Older diagnostic criteria required only 12.) A less clear marker of PMOS is enlarged ovaries. Ovaries must be at least 10 cm^{3} to count as enlarged. For sexually active people and those who consent, a transvaginal ultrasound approach is preferred. If transvaginal ultrasound is unacceptable (for personal or cultural reasons), a transabdominal ultrasound can be performed. Alternatively, AMH levels can be tested in the blood.

=== Differential diagnosis ===
To diagnose PMOS, other conditions must first be ruled out. These include thyroid disease (assessed via thyroid stimulating hormone), hyperprolactinemia (assessed via prolactin), and non-classic congenital adrenal hyperplasia (tested via 17-hydroxy progesterone). For those without any periods whatsoever or more severe signs or symptoms, further tests are recommended to exclude hypogonadotropic hypogonadism, any androgen-producing tumors or Cushing's disease. Overt virilisation (development of male sex characteristics) is not characteristic of PMOS and indicates that another underlying condition may be responsible.

== Management ==
PMOS has no cure, and management focuses on relief of symptoms. Treatment usually involves lifestyle changes such as diet and exercise of moderate intensity. Metabolic issues can further be treated with metformin or GLP-1 receptor agonists. For women with a BMI over 35, bariatric surgery may be an option. Combined oral contraceptives are especially effective and used as the first line of treatment to reduce acne and hirsutism and regulate the menstrual cycle. Other typical acne treatments and hair removal techniques may be used. First-line treatment for fertility issues uses ovulation induction with clomiphene or letrozole. As PMOS is associated with psychological disorders and cardiovascular risk, screening for both is recommended.

=== Lifestyle ===
Weight management and a healthy lifestyle are first-line treatments for PMOS. Weight management includes the prevention of weight gain, losing some weight, or maintaining weight loss. Limited weight loss of 5% shows metabolic benefits, and possibly benefits for reproductive health. There is little evidence that one type of healthy diet is better than another in PMOS. In terms of exercise, the general population guidance of 150 minutes of moderate-intensity exercise per week is recommended to prevent weight gain. For weight loss, 250 minutes of moderate exercise is recommended.

Lifestyle changes for people with PMOS have been proven to be difficult due to various factors. Some studies indicate that women with PMOS might have problems with feeling sated after eating, making weight loss more challenging. Sleep disorders, more prevalent in women with PMOS, cause fatigue, which further makes a healthy lifestyle more difficult. Finally, issues with body image, eating disorders, depression, or lack of intrinsic motivation (not enjoying exercise) may make lifestyle interventions more difficult.

Lifestyle interventions for women with PMOS may include strategies such as setting goals, tracking progress, learning assertiveness, and relapse prevention. These approaches aim to support weight control, a healthy lifestyle, and emotional well-being. Support may also involve using SMART goals (specific, measurable, achievable, realistic, and timely). Broader behavioural or cognitive behavioural programmes may help increase motivation, continued participation, and long-term healthy habits.

=== Medications ===
Medications for PMOS include metformin and oral contraceptives. Metformin is a medication commonly used in type 2 diabetes, and is used frequently off-label in the management of PMOS. It is recommended for those with a BMI over 25 to treat insulin resistance and normalise lipid profiles, and can also be considered for the treatment of irregular periods in adolescents and for those with a BMI under 25. Metformin is associated with several side effects, including abdominal pain, metallic taste in the mouth, diarrhoea and vomiting. It can also be used to help women get pregnant, but it is not the most effective drug for it.

Combined oral contraceptives (COCs) can be used to reduce the symptoms of hirsutism and regulate menstrual periods. They increase sex hormone binding globulin production, and reduce levels of androgens. A regular cycle reduces the risk of endometrial cancer. Contraceptive pills with only progestogens can be used to improve menstrual regularity, but not for symptoms of androgen excess. Antiandrogens such as finasteride and flutamide do not show advantages over COCs for treating hirsutism, but can be an option for people for whom COCs are contraindicated or who do not tolerate them. It may take six to twelve months for COCs to be effective for hirsutism. For the treatment of androgenic alopecia, a combination of antiandrogens and combined oral contraceptives can be tried, but it is difficult to treat.

GLP-1 receptor agonists, such as liraglutide and semaglutide, may be more effective than metformin alone at metabolic improvements. Their combination has stronger effects than either therapy alone. Small trials have found positive effects on menstrual regularity and androgen levels. These drugs are not recommended when trying to conceive. There is some evidence inositol may have positive effects on metabolic issues in PMOS. However, metformin is recommended over inositol supplements for hirsutism and abdominal fat reduction.

=== Infertility ===
It can be difficult to become pregnant with PMOS due to irregular ovulation. The first management step is to improve the general health of the mother, such as through lifestyle interventions. GLP-1 agonist for weight loss can be used, but should be stopped at least 2 months before conception. As of 2025, there is not enough data to know if they are safe in pregnancy. Pregnancy in PMOS is more risky than normal, and treatment is focused on getting a single pregnancy, rather than, for instance, twins (multiple pregnancy). With treatment, the eventual family size of women with PMOS does not seem different to those without.

The first-line medical treatment for infertility in women with PMOS is letrozole (Femara) to induce ovulation. This is, in general, more effective than clomiphene citrate to improve both pregnancy rates and live births. Other medications that can be used to treat infertility, listed from most to least effective, are metformin + clomiphene citrate, clomiphene citrate alone, and metformin alone. Women may be more likely to experience gastrointestinal side effects with metformin. Gonadotrophin therapy may be effective too, but requires monitoring and increases the risks of multiple pregnancies.

When medication and lifestyle interventions are ineffective, infertility can be treated with a laparoscopic procedure called "ovarian drilling", which involves puncture of 4–10 small follicles with electrocautery, laser, or biopsy needles. This procedure can induce ovulation, typically leads to a single pregnancy, but other risks may be higher compared to medication. The procedure might lead to lower chance of live births compared to medication alone. Ovarian wedge resection is no longer used as much due to complications such as adhesions and the presence of frequently effective medications.

As a final treatment option, in vitro fertilisation (IVF) can be considered. IVF does increase the risk of ovarian hyperstimulation syndrome. Using a 'freeze all' strategy makes it easier to transfer a single embryo and provides time for the ovaries to recover from hyperstimulation. A less effective alternative, but with much lower risks of ovarian hyperstimulation syndrome, is in vitro maturation instead of full IVF. This option avoids high-dose gonadotropin therapy.

=== Hirsutism and acne ===
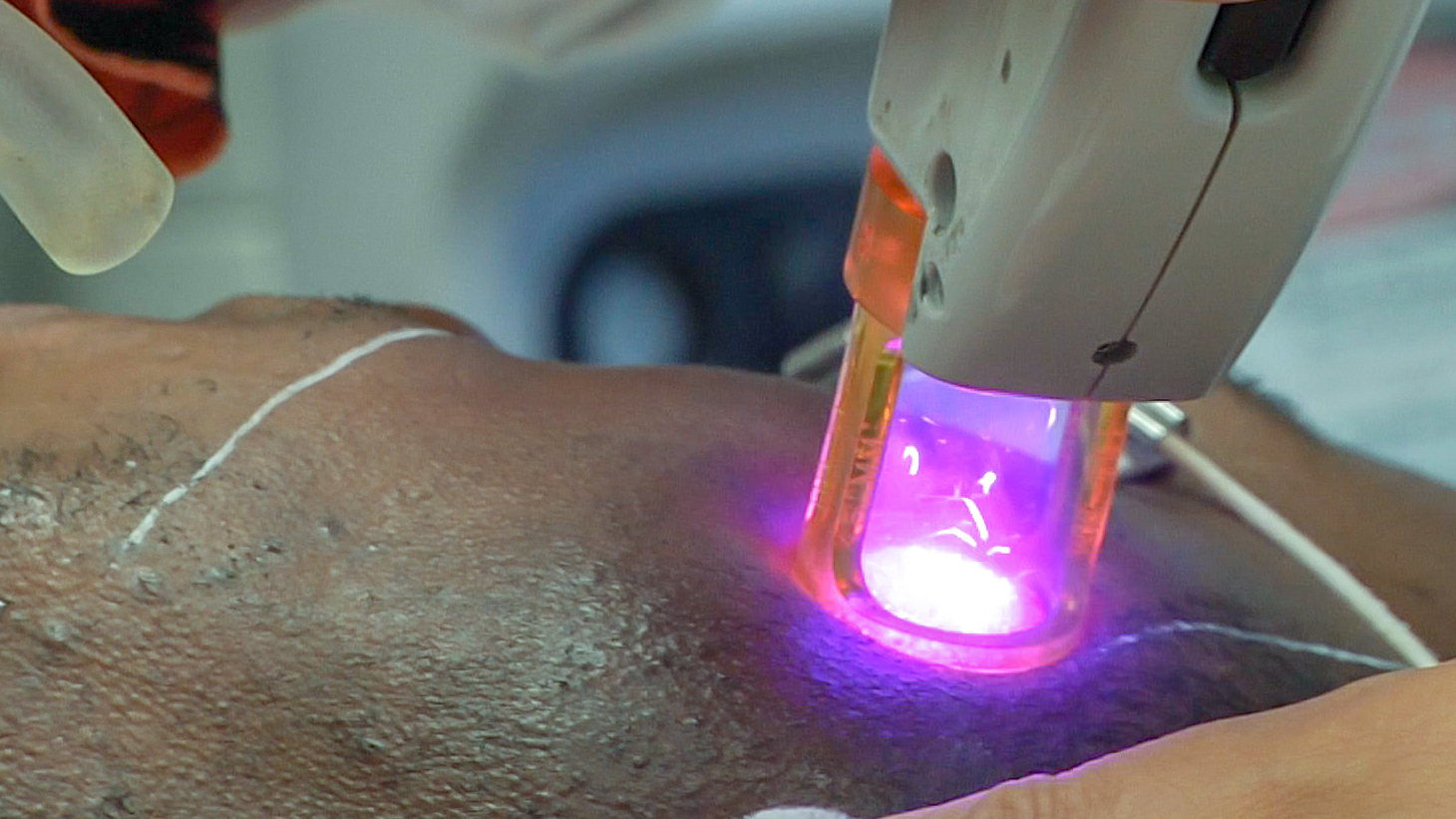
Laser hair removal

Management of hirsutism involves lowering androgen levels and removing existing hair, for example, by laser treatment or shaving. A standard contraceptive pill is frequently effective in reducing hirsutism and acne. Progestogens such as norgestrel and levonorgestrel should be avoided due to their androgenic effects. Metformin combined with an oral contraceptive may be more effective than the oral contraceptive on its own. Although oral contraceptives have shown significant efficacy in clinical trials (60–100% of individuals for treatment of hirsutism), severe acne or hirsutism might require additional treatment.

Other medications with antiandrogen effects include flutamide and spironolactone, which can improve hirsutism. Antiandrogens are sometimes used, such as finasteride, but they are contraindicated in pregnancy. Finasteride inhibits the conversion of testosterone to its stronger form dihydrotestosterone.

=== Mental health ===
Women with PMOS are far more likely to have depression than women without PMOS. Symptoms of depression might be heightened by certain symptoms of the condition, such as hirsutism or obesity, that can lead to low self-esteem or poor body image. Screening for depression and anxiety disorders is recommended using validated questionnaires, for instance, at diagnosis as well as afterwards, based on clinical judgement. For eating disorders and body image distress, screening is only recommended when clinically indicated. For sexually active women who give permission to discuss it, psychosexual dysfunction can be assessed too.

Treatment of PMOS shows no to moderate effect on depression or anxiety, and standard therapies (such a psychotherapy and antidepressants) are recommended instead. Cognitive behaviour therapy can be used for girls and women with low self-esteem, poor body image, disordered eating or psychosexual dysfunction.

=== Screening for cardiometabolic issues ===
Given the higher risk of cardiometabolic conditions, monitoring is recommended. This includes testing of glucose tolerance, using a two-hour oral glucose tolerance test (GTT) in all women with PMOS. After initial testing at diagnosis, follow-up assessments are advised every one to three years, depending on the presence of diabetes risk factors. Screening for cardiovascular risk factors includes lipid profile tests and yearly blood pressure measurements.

== Epidemiology ==
PMOS is the most common hormonal disorder (endocrine disorder) among women of reproductive age. When someone is infertile due to a lack of ovulation, PMOS is the most common cause.

According to the World Health Organization (WHO), PMOS affects over 6 to 13% of reproductive-aged women. A 2022 review noted a prevalence between 5% and 18%. The prevalence of PMOS depends on the choice of diagnostic criteria. Using the Rotterdam criteria, around 10–13% of women have PMOS. Based on the NIH criteria, the global prevalence was 5.5%, increasing to approximately 7.1% when using the Androgen Excess Society criteria. Irrespective of the criteria, the prevalence of PMOS is increasing, likely due to an aging population, more awareness, and increasing obesity rates.

Prevalence seems fairly even among people with different ethnicities, but may be higher in people from Southeast Asia and the Eastern Mediterranean. But PMOS can express differently. For instance, in African and Hispanic American people with PMOS, there is more insulin resistance compared to other ethnic groups. The same is true for South Asian people with PMOS, who also have more metabolic symptoms and higher BMIs. East Asian women typically have less hirsutism and lower BMI compared to other groups. While early small-scale studies found that transmasculine people were more likely to have PMOS than cis women, this was not found in a larger, more rigorous study.

== History ==
Historical descriptions of possible PMOS symptoms date to ancient Greece, where Hippocrates described women with "thick, oily skin and absence of menstruation." The earliest known description of what is now recognized as PMOS dates from 1721 in Italy, which described "Young married peasant women, moderately obese and infertile, with two larger than normal ovaries, bumpy, shiny and whitish, just like pigeon eggs". Polycystic ovaries were likely first formally described in 1844 by the French doctor Achille Chereau.

In 1935, American gynecologists Irving F. Stein and Michael L. Leventhal published a report linking polycystic ovaries to hirsutism, infertility, and lack of periods. The report also hypothesised that PMOS results from endocrine dysfunction, initiating research into its hormonal causes and giving rise to the term Stein–Leventhal syndrome. By the 1980s, the metabolic side of PMOS started to be studied, before the start of genetics research in the 1990s.

== Terminology ==
The name used until 2026, polycystic ovary syndrome (PCOS), derived from a typical finding on medical images called "polycystic ovary morphology". A polycystic ovary has an abnormally large number of developing follicles, looking like many small cysts. There were various objections to the name polycystic ovary syndrome: the "cysts" are not truly cysts, but arrested follicles. Having many follicles in the ovaries is also not unique to PMOS, and is often seen in women without PMOS, particularly adolescents. Furthermore, the name implied that PMOS is a gynecological condition only, rather than a metabolic and endocrine condition.

Other previous names for PMOS were Stein–Leventhal syndrome and polycystic ovary disease. Suggested names included hyperandrogenic (chronic) anovulation, estrogenic ovulatory dysfunction or functional female hyperandrogenism. For specific subgroups, suggested names included multi-follicular ovarian disorder for those with polycystic ovary morphology, and metabolic hyperandrogenic syndrome for those meeting the NIH PMOS criteria. Following discussions among clinicians and people with PCOS, a majority of whom were in favour of renaming the condition, a survey was launched to find a new name.

In 2026, an article by Helena Teede and others in The Lancet described the "multistep global consensus process" through which clinicians agreed to rename the condition "polyendocrine metabolic ovarian syndrome" (PMOS). The previous term PCOS was considered "inaccurate, implying pathological ovarian cysts, obscuring diverse endocrine and metabolic features, and contributing to delayed diagnosis, fragmented care, and stigma, while curtailing research and policy framing." The new term reflects "the condition's multisystem pathophysiology", and is more accurate by omitting cysts.

== Research directions ==
Key research questions in PMOS focus on the best way to manage the condition, including with new anti-obesity drugs. In terms of criteria for diagnosis, age-specific levels of AMH need to be specified. Biomarkers are needed for early diagnosis and to guide drug development. Another open question is how to define the male phenotype to assess male relatives of women with PMOS.

Research is exploring better ways to assess and predict metabolic complications. Current clinical tests for insulin resistance lack accuracy and standardisation, and the gold-standard method is impractical in clinical settings. Emerging approaches include multiomics, which may uncover biomarkers for diagnosis and subtyping, and artificial intelligence (AI)-based methods, which can identify patterns in medical data and also classify patients into subgroups. Combining AI with omics might improve early diagnosis, risk prediction, personalised treatment, and long-term monitoring, though robust validation in large, diverse cohorts remains necessary.

As of 2024, studies have successfully developed in vitro PMOS disease models through human embryonic stem cells (hESCs) and induced pluripotent stem cell technology (iPSC). Both can be derived from individuals with PMOS and can differentiate into various cell types. Using adult somatic cells, iPSCs can reprogram the cells into a pluripotent state, which can then be specified to replicate PMOS-like traits. Furthermore, 3D "organoid" models of female reproductive tissue, such as the uterus and ovaries, produced from iPSCs, present a way to stimulate the development of reproductive disorders such as PMOS in vitro.

== Society and culture ==
The direct economic costs of PMOS in the United States are estimated to be over $15 billion per year (in 2021 USD). This includes the costs of managing PMOS, treating its complications such as strokes, and its mental health costs. Compared to arthritis and lupus—diseases with a similar or lower prevalence and similar severity—PMOS received lower NIH research funding between 2005 and 2015. Australia likewise saw a low number of grants. This possible underfunding reflects a gender bias in health care, where conditions mostly affecting women receive less research funding.

There is substantial misinformation on PMOS in social media. For example, some health influencers promote restrictive diets, such as eliminating gluten or dairy, for which there is no evidence of effectiveness. Others recommend against intensive cardiovascular exercise, despite its usefulness. Some social media influencers without medical qualifications, including those with large followings, have presented themselves as authorities on PMOS to promote their unproven treatments, taking advantage of the limited medical options available for treating the condition.

Research has identified notable gaps in physician knowledge and education related to PMOS, which may contribute to challenges in timely diagnosis and treatment. For instance, health care professionals in primary care, but also in gynecology and reproductive specialists, are often unfamiliar with the precise diagnostic criteria. In terms of management, many professionals have limited knowledge of associated metabolic conditions, recommended screening, and psychological impacts. Diagnosis is often delayed, and those with PMOS are usually dissatisfied with care.

== See also ==
- Androgen-dependent syndromes
