= Peak bone mass =

Peak bone mass is the maximum amount of bone a person has during their life. It typically occurs in the early 20s in females and late 20s in males. Peak bone mass is typically lower in females than males, and is also lower in White people and Asians compared to black populations. A way to determine bone mass is to look at the size and density of the mineralized tissue in the periosteal envelope and using the bone mineral density (BMD) of a person can help determine the strength of that bone. Research has shown that puberty affects bone size much more because during this time males typically undergo a longer bone maturation period than women which is why women are more prone to osteoporosis than men.
