= Oligomenorrhea =

Less frequent menstruation

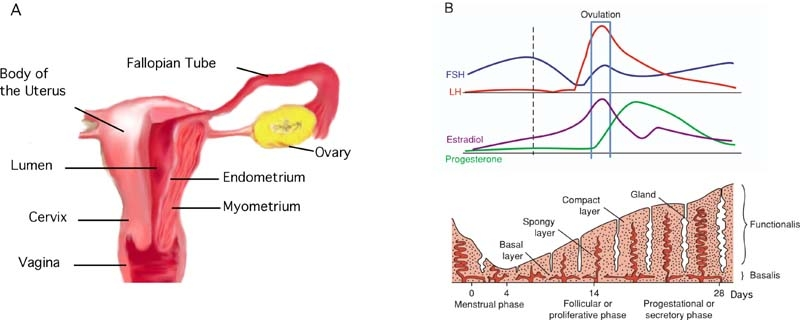
- Uterine Anatomy and the Menstrual Cycle
- Specialty: Gynaecology

Oligomenorrhea is an abnormal bleeding pattern where menstrual bleeding occurs at intervals of greater than 35 days, with fewer than 9 periods in a year. The period may be light in flow, short in duration or occur at irregular intervals. Oligomenorrhea is common in adolescent females in the first few years following menarche.

Causes of oligomenorrhea range from chromosomal abnormalities to hypothalamic-pituitary conditions to hormonal imbalances. A common cause of oligomenorrhea is polyendocrine metabolic ovarian syndrome (PMOS), a hormonal imbalance that results in menstrual irregularity.

== Menarche ==
Menarche is the first menstrual bleed in a female that has reached reproductive age. The median age at menarche is "12-13 years old across well-nourished populations in developed countries". While the timing of pubertal development may vary among individuals, the order in which it occurs is fairly standard. Puberty in females begins with thelarche (breast development) followed by pubarche (growth of pubic and axillary hair) then followed, typically within 2–3 years of thelarche, by menarche. During adolescence, menstrual cycle intervals and durations may vary while the hypothalamic-pituitary-ovarian axis begins to mature. Anovulation during the first few years of menstruation after menarche can cause variation in cycle intervals. A normal menstrual cycle typically lasts between 21–35 days.

== Clinical signs and symptoms ==
The signs and symptoms of oligomenorrhea can vary depending on the cause. Infrequent periods or irregular cycle intervals are the most common symptoms individuals experience. While it is expected for menses to be irregular shortly following menarche, cycles should not be longer than 45 days in length. Acne, headaches, fatigue, excessive hair growth, anxiety, and impaired vision can also occur depending on the cause of menstrual irregularity. Sudden onset pain, persistent pain, or cyclic pain are symptoms that should be evaluated promptly.

== Causes ==
=== Premature ovarian insufficiency ===
Premature ovarian insufficiency (POI), also known as primary ovarian insufficiency, is defined as "menopause before the age of 40" and presents as a "spectrum of declining ovarian function" resulting in reduced fertility due to a decrease in ovarian follicle number. While majority of cases of POI are idiopathic, chromosomal abnormalities that result in the damage or loss of the X chromosome (i.e. Turner Syndrome, FMR1 pre-mutation carriers) have been described to reduce ovarian functionality and lead to premature ovarian insufficiency. Other causes of POI include autoimmune disorders, chemotherapy, and pelvic radiation which cause rapid ovarian destruction and follicular depletion. In those experiencing oligomenorrhea or menstrual irregularity, a diagnosis of POI can be confirmed with two elevated follicle-stimulating hormone levels (greater than 30-40 mIU/mL) at least 1 month apart.

=== Turner Syndrome ===
Turner Syndrome is a chromosomal disorder where individuals have complete or partial loss of a single X chromosome, with the most common karyotype being 45,XO. While primary amenorrhea is most common among those with Turner Syndrome, oligomenorrhea can be a symptom that these individuals experience. Typical physical characteristics of Turner Syndrome include a webbed neck, low hairline, short stature, broad chest, and congenital heart defects. Irregular or absent menstrual cycles can occur with this condition as a result of streak ovaries or gonadal dysgenesis. It has been found that in individuals with Turner Syndrome "oocyte apoptosis is markedly accelerated in the early stage of fetal life," leading to low ovarian reserve and menstrual abnormalities. Many of these individuals are often first diagnosed when evaluated for menstrual irregularities.

=== Polyendocrine metabolic ovarian syndrome ===
People with Polyendocrine metabolic ovarian syndrome (PMOS) are also likely to have oligomenorrhea. PMOS is a hormone disorder that is characterized by hyperandrogenism, polycystic ovaries, and menstrual irregularity. While there is no universally recognized definition of PMOS, all diagnostic schema require presence of at least two of the defining characteristics. Clinical signs of hyperandrogenism can include hirsutism, acne, acanthosis, virilization (deepening of the voice, male-pattern balding), weight gain, and menstrual abnormalities. Menstrual irregularity and infertility are common clinical manifestations of PMOS where individuals may experience infrequent periods, absent periods, or heavy and unpredictable cycles. As a result of hormone imbalance and chronic anovluation, individuals with PMOS can develop endometrial hyperplasia which can in-turn increase the risk of endometrial cancer. PMOS is often associated with insulin resistance and obesity, conditions that increase the risk for chronic diseases such as type 2 diabetes and cardiovascular disease.

=== Functional hypothalamic amenorrhea ===
Functional hypothalamic amenorrhea (FHA) is a common cause of oligomenorrhea and occurs due to a lack of growth hormone secretion resulting in low FSH and LH levels. Without ovarian stimulation by FSH and LH, there is a lack of normal follicular development and ovulation resulting in oligomenorrhea or amenorrhea. Eating disorders are risk factors for FHA due to the disruption of the normal hypothalamic-pituitary-ovarian axis. Although menstrual disorders are most strongly associated with anorexia nervosa, bulimia nervosa may also result in oligomenorrhea or amenorrhea. There is some controversy regarding the mechanism for the menstrual dysregulation, since amenorrhea may sometimes precede substantial weight loss in some anorexics. Endurance exercises such as running or swimming can affect the reproductive physiology of female athletes. Female runners, swimmers and ballet dancers either menstruate infrequently in comparison to non-athletic females of comparable age or exhibit amenorrhea. A more recent study shows that athletes competing in sports that emphasize thinness or a specific weight exhibit a higher rate of menstrual dysfunction than either athletes competing in sports with less focus on these or control subjects.

=== Other causes ===
Oligomenorrhea can be a result of other various causes including prolactinomas (adenomas of the anterior pituitary), thyrotoxicosis, hormonal changes in perimenopause, Prader–Willi syndrome, and Graves' disease, certain medications, and breastfeeding.

== Diagnostic analysis ==
Laboratory analysis of an individual experiencing oligomenorrhea may be a necessary part of evaluation. If the individual is sexually active, regardless of contraception use, it is important to test for possible pregnancy. Hormone levels, including FSH, LH, thyroid-stimulating hormone, and prolactin can be considered in the initial laboratory workup. If there are clinical signs of hyperandrogenism, testing of free testosterone and DHEA-S levels may be indicated. Those suspected of Turner Syndrome can confirm via karyotype. A complete blood count and comprehensive metabolic panel can be considered for further evaluation of other chronic illness.

Depending on an individual's history and symptoms, diagnostic imaging can be considered to help determine the cause of oligomenorrhea. Pelvic ultrasound can help to evaluate pelvic anatomy and identify reproductive structural abnormalities. Brain imaging using magnetic resonance imaging (MRI) can be considered if a pituitary adenoma is suspected.

== Management ==
Treatment and management of oligomenorrhea will vary depending on the cause. A progesterone challenge test can be considered to help evaluate if the menstrual disorder is due to anovulation, low estrogen, a non-responsive endometrium, or another uterine abnormality.

Treatment for premature ovarian insufficiency should focus on minimizing complications from estrogen deficiency. Hormone therapy in premenopausal individuals will help to replace hormones normally produced by the ovaries. Estrogen replacement can work to prevent osteoporosis, cardiovascular disease, and menopausal symptoms.

Weight loss in those with PMOS has been shown to improve insulin resistance, decrease circulating androgen levels, and restore ovarian function. The use of combined hormonal birth control pills has been shown to help regulate menstrual cycles and decrease the risk of endometrial cancer.

Treatment of functional hypothalamic amenorrhea should involve nutritional rehabilitation and regulating stress levels. Individuals that have been identified with an eating disorder should consider evaluation from psychology for treatment of eating or mood disorders. Individuals with severe nutrient deficiency may have increased risk for complications related to estrogen deficiency. Estrogen replacement may be necessary for bone recovery in those with signs of low bone mineral density.

== Amenorrhea ==
Amenorrhea can be defined as a complete absence of menses. Amenorrhea can be divided into two categories: primary and secondary amenorrhea. Primary amenorrhea occurs when no menses occurs by the age of 15 with or without evidence of secondary sexual characteristics, or if no menses occur within three years of thelarche. The causes of amenorrhea overlap with the causes of oligomenorrhea, with oligomenorrhea being a potential prodrome of amenorrhea.

== See also ==
- Amenorrhea: absence of the menstrual period
- Menorrhagia: unusually heavy periods
