= List of side effects of estradiol =

List of side effects of estradiol which may occur as a result of its use or have been associated with estrogen and/or progestogen therapy includes:

- Gynecological: changes in vaginal bleeding, dysmenorrhea, increase in size of uterine leiomyomata, vaginitis including vaginal candidiasis, changes in cervical secretion and cervical ectropion, ovarian cancer, endometrial hyperplasia, endometrial cancer, nipple discharge, galactorrhea, fibrocystic breast changes and breast cancer.
- Cardiovascular: chest pain, deep and superficial venous thrombosis, pulmonary embolism, thrombophlebitis, myocardial infarction, stroke, and increased blood pressure.
- Gastrointestinal: nausea and vomiting, abdominal cramps, bloating, diarrhea, dyspepsia, dysuria, gastritis, cholestatic jaundice, increased incidence of gallbladder disease, pancreatitis, or enlargement of hepatic hemangiomas.
- Cutaneous: chloasma or melasma (which may continue despite discontinuation of the drug), erythema multiforme, erythema nodosum, otitis media, hemorrhagic eruption, loss of scalp hair, pruritus, or rash.
- Ocular: retinal vascular thrombosis, steepening of corneal curvature or intolerance to contact lenses.
- Central: headache, migraine, dizziness, chorea, nervousness/anxiety, mood disturbances, irritability, changes in libido, worsening of epilepsy, and increased risk of dementia.
- Others: changes in weight, reduced carbohydrate tolerance, worsening of porphyria, edema, arthralgias, bronchitis, leg cramps, hemorrhoids, urticaria, angioedema, anaphylactic reactions, syncope, toothache, tooth disorder, urinary incontinence, hypocalcemia, exacerbation of asthma, and increased triglycerides.
