= Gynecologic hemorrhage =

Excessive bleeding of the female reproductive system

Gynecologic hemorrhage represents excessive bleeding of the female reproductive system. Such bleeding could be visible or external, namely bleeding from the vagina, or it could be internal into the pelvic cavity or form a hematoma. Normal menstruation is not considered a gynecologic hemorrhage, as it is not excessive. Hemorrhage associated with a pregnant state or during delivery is an obstetrical hemorrhage.

== Types ==
- Metrorrhagia (metro = womb, -rrhagia = excessive flow) is uterine bleeding at irregular intervals, particularly between the expected menstrual periods.
- Postcoital bleeding is vaginal bleeding after sexual intercourse.

== Causes ==
Causes of gynecologic bleeding include:

=== Hormonal ===
Anovulation is a common cause of gynecological hemorrhage. Under the influence of estrogen the endometrium (uterine lining) is stimulated and eventually such lining will be shed off (estrogen breakthrough bleeding). The anovulation chapter discusses its multiple possible causes. Longstanding anovulation can also lead to endometrial hyperplasia and facilitate the development of endometrial cancer.

=== Neoplasm ===
1. Cancer of the uterus is always a concern, specifically when the bleeding occurs after menopause. Other types of cancer include cervical cancer; bleeding in that case can sometimes be triggered by postcoital bleeding. Cancers of the vagina or fallopian tubes are rare causes of hemorrhage.
2. Uterine fibroids represent a common, benign condition that may lead to bleeding, specifically if the lesion affects the uterine cavity.
3. Polyps of the uterine lining are a common cause of bleeding, but such bleeding tends to be light.

=== Trauma ===
1. Sexual assault and rape can lead to injury and gynecological hemorrhage.
2. Accidents to the lower abdomen may lead to internal or external bleeding.

=== Bleeding disorder ===
Women with a bleeding disorder may be prone to more excessive bleeding. A hematologic work-up should discover the cause.

=== Other ===
On occasion an ovarian cyst can rupture and give rise to internal hemorrhage. This may occur during ovulation or as a result of endometriosis.

If the pregnancy test is positive, consider pregnancy related bleeding (see obstetrical hemorrhage), including miscarriage and ectopic pregnancy.

== Diagnosis ==
A history will establish if the condition is acute or chronic, and if external circumstances are involved. A gynecologic examination is usually complemented by a gynecologic ultrasonography. A blood count determines the degree of anemia and may point out bleeding problems. The pregnancy test is important, particularly as bleeding in early pregnancy presents as gynecological hemorrhage and ectopic pregnancy can be fatal. Diagnosis is broadly classified into supportive and definitive investigations:

=== Supportive ===
1. Complete blood count to assess degree of anemia.
2. Ultrasonography to rule out uterine lesions, PID.

=== Definitive ===
1. Pregnancy test for those who are not yet post menopausal mandatory.
2. Speculum examination to take samples for pap smear.
3. Dilation and curettage to get samples for histology and also control the bleeding if associated with abortion.
4. Colposcopy.

=== Definition ===
Menstruation occurs typically monthly, lasts 3–7 days, and involves up to 80 ml blood. Bleeding in excess of this norm in a nonpregnant woman constitutes gynecologic hemorrhage. In addition, early pregnancy bleeding has sometimes been included as gynecologic hemorrhage, namely bleeding from a miscarriage or an ectopic pregnancy, while it actually represents obstetrical bleeding. However, from a practical view, early pregnancy bleeding is usually handled like a gynecological hemorrhage.

=== First aid ===
Gynecologic hemorrhage needs to be evaluated as soon as possible by a physician. The amount and duration of bleeding will dictate whether a bleeding event is an emergency event.

== Treatment ==
Treatment depends on diagnosis and may include hormonal therapy, IV fluids, blood transfusion, and/or a dilation and curettage. Internal bleeding requires laparoscopy or abdominal surgery, in rare and extreme cases a hysterectomy is performed.

== See also ==
- Medical emergency
- Istihadha
