= Postcoital bleeding =

Non-menstrual vaginal bleeding during or after sexual intercourse

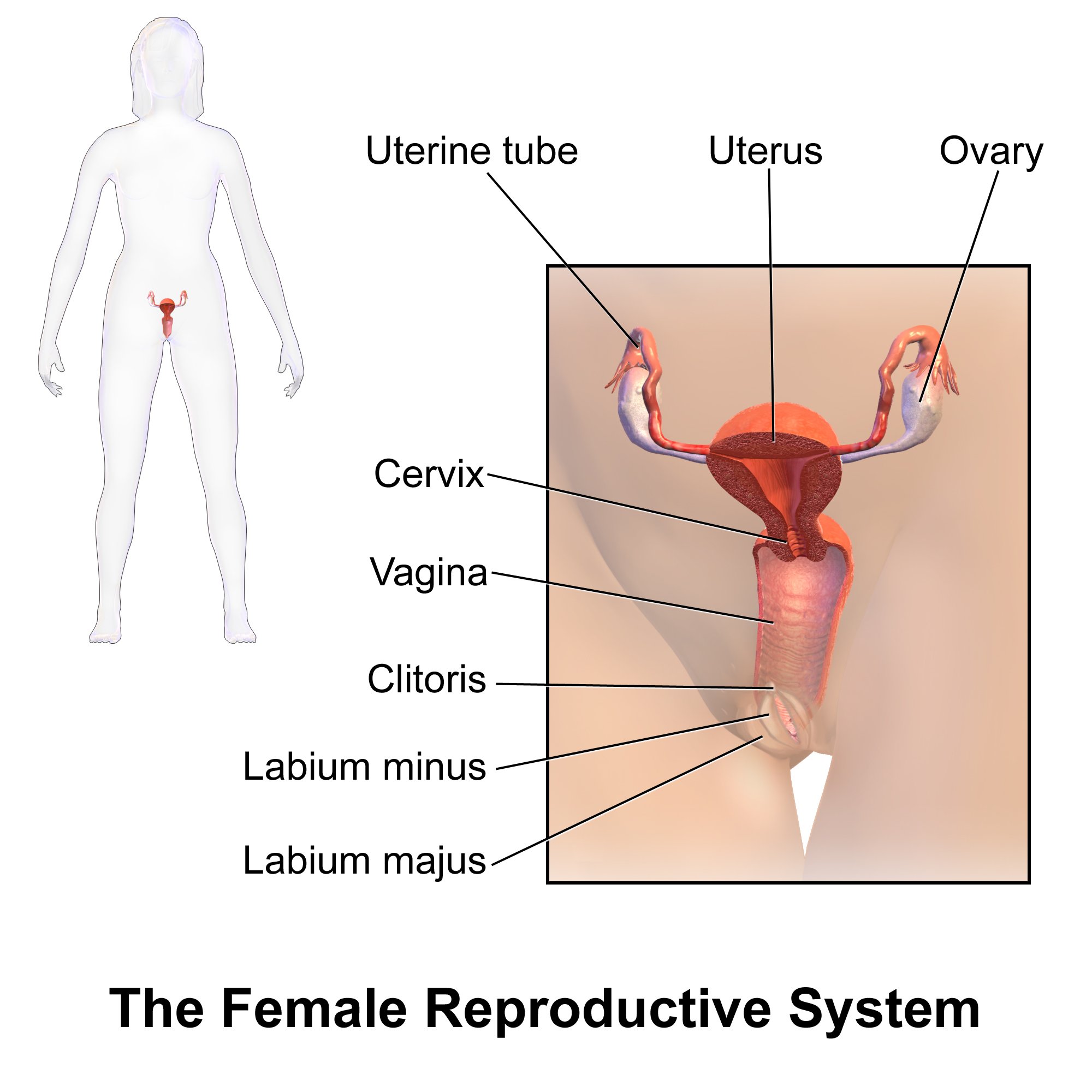
- Specialty: Gynecology
- Frequency: Common

Postcoital bleeding (PCB) is non-menstrual vaginal bleeding that occurs during or after sexual intercourse. Though some causes are with associated pain, it is typically painless and frequently associated with intermenstrual bleeding.

The bleeding can be from the uterus, cervix, vagina and other tissue or organs located near the vagina. Postcoital bleeding can be one of the first indications of cervical cancer. There are other reasons why vaginal bleeding may occur after intercourse.

Some women will bleed after intercourse for the first time but others will not. The hymen may bleed if it is stretched since it is thin tissue. Other activities may have an effect on the vagina such as sports and tampon use. Postcoital bleeding may stop without treatment. In some instances, postcoital bleeding may resemble menstrual irregularities. Postcoital bleeding may occur throughout pregnancy.

The presence of cervical polyps may result in postcoital bleeding during pregnancy because the tissue of the polyps is more easily damaged. Postcoital bleeding can be due to trauma after consensual and non-consensual sexual intercourse.

A diagnosis to determine the cause will include obtaining a medical history and assessing the symptoms. Treatment is not always necessary.

== Causes ==
Vaginal bleeding after sex is a symptom that can indicate:

- pelvic inflammatory disease
- pelvic organ prolapse
- uterine disease
- chlamydia or other sexually transmitted infection
- atrophic vaginitis
- childbirth
- inadequate vaginal lubrication
- benign polyps
- cervical erosion (inflammation of the cervix)
- cervical or vaginal cancer
- anatomical abnormality of the uterus, vagina or both.
- pregnancy
- endometrial polyps
- endometrial hyperplasia
- endometrial carcinoma
- leiomyomata
- cervicitis
- cervical dysplasia
- endometriosis
- coagulation defects
- trauma

Bleeding from hemorrhoids and vulvar lesions can be mistaken for postcoital bleeding. Post coital bleeding can occur with discharge, itching, or irritation. This may be due to Trichomonas or Candida. A lack of estrogen can make vaginal tissue thinner and more susceptible to bleeding. Some have proposed that birth control pills may cause postcoital bleeding.

Risk factors for developing postcoital bleeding are: low estrogen levels, rape and 'rough sex'.

== Diagnosis and treatment ==
Tests and detailed examination are used to determine the cause of the bleeding:

- a pregnancy test
- a pelvic examination
- obtaining tissue samples
- pap smear
- colposcopic examination of the vagina and cervix
- ultrasound
- histogram
- cultures for bacteria
- biopsy of tissues

A referral may be made to a specialist. Imaging may not be necessary. Cryotherapy has been used but is not recommended.

== Epidemiology ==
Postcoital bleeding rarely is associated with gynecological cancer in young women and its incidence is projected to drop due to the widespread immunizations against HPV. Postcoital bleeding has been most studied in women in the US. In a large Taiwanese study, the overall incidence of postcoital bleeding was found to be 39-59 per 100,000 women. Those with postcoital bleeding had a higher risk of cervical dysplasia and cervical cancer. Benign causes of postcoital bleeding were associated with cervical erosion, ectropion, vaginitis and vulvovaginitis. Other associations were noted such as the presence of leukoplakia of the cervix, an intrauterine contraceptive device, cervical polyps, cervicitis, menopause, dyspareunia, and vulvodynia. In Scotland approximately 1 in 600 women aged 20–24 experience unexplained bleeding. A study of African women found that trauma from consensual sexual intercourse was a cause of postcoital bleeding in young women.

== In society and culture ==
Hymenorrhaphy is a controversial procedure to surgically repair a damaged hymen, thus restoring the appearance of virginity:

"From a Western-ethics perspective, the life-saving potential of the procedure is weighed against the role of the surgeon in directly assisting in a deception and in indirectly promoting cultural practices of sexual inequality. From an Islamic bioethical vantage point, jurists offer two opinions. The first is that the surgery is always impermissible. The second is that although the surgery is generally impermissible, it can become licit when the risks of not having postcoital bleeding harm are sufficiently great."

== See also ==
- Female genital mutilation
- Gynecologic hemorrhage
- Menstruation
- Metrorrhagia
