= Irregular bleeding =

Irregular bleeding may refer to:

- Irregular menstruation
  - Oligomenorrhea
  - Metrorrhagia
- Breakthrough bleeding, usually referring to mid-cycle uterine bleeding in users of combined oral contraceptives
