= Haiz =

Haiz may refer to:

- Haiz (حيض ḥaiẓ), menstruation in Islam
- Haiz (EP), a 2015 extended play by Hailee Steinfeld
- El Haiz, a Roman castle at the Bahariya Oasis, Egypt
