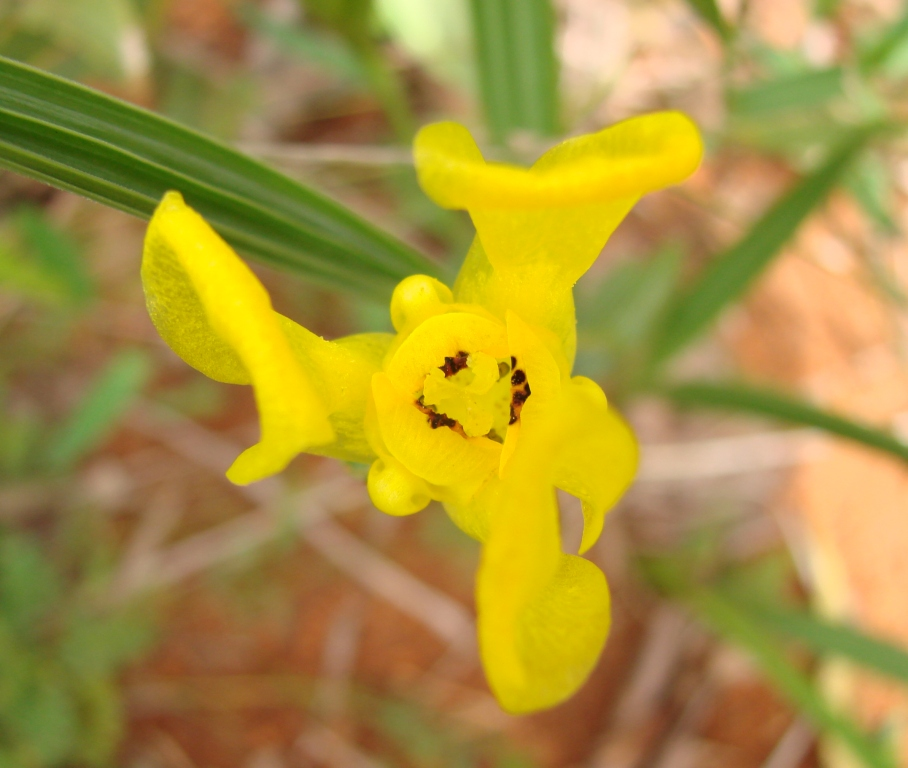
- Cipura xanthomelas

Scientific classification
- Kingdom: Plantae
- Clade: Tracheophytes
- Clade: Angiosperms
- Clade: Monocots
- Order: Asparagales
- Family: Iridaceae
- Subfamily: Iridoideae
- Tribe: Tigridieae
- Genus: Cipura; Aubl.

Type species
- Cipura paludosia Aubl.

Synonyms
- Bauxia Neck.; Marica Schreb.

= Cipura =

Genus of flowering plants

Cipura is a genus of perennial, herbaceous and bulbous plants in the family Iridaceae, related to the genus Cypella. The plants are widely distributed in Mexico, Central, the West Indies, and South America.

Species

- Cipura campanulata Ravenna – from central Mexico to northern Brazil
- Cipura formosa Ravenna – eastern + central Brazil
- Cipura gigas Celis, Goldblatt & Betancur - Colombia + Venezuela.
- Cipura insularis Ravenna – western Cuba
- Cipura paludosa Aubl. – Mexico, South America (as far south as Paraguay), Central America, and the West Indies; naturalized in India
- Cipura paradisiaca Ravenna – Goiás State in Brazil
- Cipura rupicola Goldblatt & Henrich – eastern Colombia + southern Venezuela
- Cipura xanthomelas Maxim. ex Klatt – eastern + central Brazil
