= Bleeding in pregnancy =

Bleeding in pregnancy may refer to:

- Early pregnancy bleeding, which is bleeding before 24 weeks gestational age
- Obstetrical bleeding, which is bleeding that occurs after 24 weeks gestational age including the postpartum period
