= Chorionic hematoma =

- Other names: Chorionic hemorrhage, chorionic bleed
- Ultrasound showing a subchorionic hemorrhage

Chorionic hematoma is the pooling of blood (hematoma) between the chorion, a membrane surrounding the embryo, and the uterine wall. It occurs in about 3.1% of all pregnancies, it is the most common sonographic abnormality and the most common cause of first trimester bleeding.

== Cause and diagnosis ==
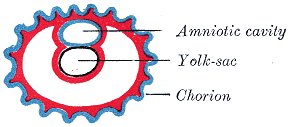
Chorion, amnion and gestational (yolk) sac

Chorionic hematomas can be caused by the separation of the chorion from the endometrium (inner membrane of the uterus). Hematomas are classified by their location between tissue layers:

- Subchorionic hematomas, the most common type, are between the chorion and endometrium.
- Retroplacental hematomas are entirely behind the placenta and not touching the gestational sac.
- Subamniotic or preplacental hematomas are contained within amnion and chorion. Rare.

Most patients with a small subchorionic hematoma are asymptomatic. Symptoms include vaginal bleeding, abdominal pain, premature labor and threatened miscarriage.

Ultrasonography is the preferred method of diagnosis. A chorionic hematoma appears on ultrasound as a hypoechoic crescent adjacent to the gestational sac. The hematoma is considered small if it is under 20% of the size of the sac and large if it is over 50%.

== Prognosis and treatment ==
The presence of subchorionic bleeding around the gestational sac does not have a significant association with miscarriage overall. However, the case of intrauterine hematoma observed before 9 weeks of gestational age has been associated with an increased risk of miscarriage. In one study women who complied with instructions for bed rest for the duration of bleeding had a lower rate of miscarriage and a higher rate of term pregnancy than non-compliant women. The study had several limitations; results were severely confounded by inherent differences between compliant and non-compliant women.

== See also ==
- Chorionic bump
