= Istihadha =

Arabic-Islamic term for menstrual flow

In Islam, the Istihadha (Arabic: اِسْتِحَاضَةٌ; flowing blood) represents a disturbance of the menstrual cycle of the woman which makes it difficult for her to perform some religious rituals (ibadah).

== Presentation ==
The woman who experiences the effects of Istihadha is called Mustahadha (Arabic: مُسْتَحَاضَةٌ) and who suffers either from excessive blood flow during the usual menstrual cycle (called menorrhagia) or bleeding outside the normal period of menstruation (called metrorrhagia).

A woman is thus considered a mustahadha if she continuously releases vaginal blood and continues to bleed after having already completed her usual period of menstruation.

This is how Istihadha is seen to be vaginal bleeding caused by reasons other than menstruation or childbirth.

For some women, this bleeding never stops, and for others, it continues for longer than a normal period, but it stops temporarily for a short time.

== Prayer ==
The jurists (fuqaha) said that the case of a woman's menstrual period (istihadha) does not waive the obligatory prayer on her behalf, because this woman is pure and can read and recite the Quran, and since the ruling on istihadha blood is different from the impurity of menstrual blood, it is sufficient for a woman's menstrual period to purify herself of blood that is in excess of her usual monthly habit in order to read the Quran from memorizing it or from the mus'haf or during prayer (salah).

The scholars relied on the permissibility of reading (tilawa) the Quran on the fact that istihadha is a minor invalidating event that requires only the reintroduction of ablution (wudu), so this condition does not nullify the obligation (wajib) of prayer and does not prevent its validity, nor is it forbidden to read (qiraat) the Quran, nor touch the mus'haf, nor enter the prayer hall in the mosque or circumambulate (tawaf) around the Kaaba.

If this blood comes under the same ruling as vaginal bleeding or gynecologic hemorrhage, then the affected woman is required to withhold the blood as much as possible through a piece of cloth, cotton and linen, and she performs ablution after hiding the blood for the time of each prayer upon entering its time (salah times) as a matter of obligatory (fard) among the majority of jurists, and as a desirable (mustahabb) as well as went to that Imam Malik ibn Anas.

== Fasting ==
A woman must abstain from fasting only at the time of her period and the occurrence of her monthly menstruation cycle, and if the bleeding continues with her and menstruation does not stop, then this means that she is suffering from vaginal bleeding.

If she has a steady habit in her number and time, then she refrains from fasting for the duration of her period only, then she bathes (ghusl), prays and fasts even if there is bleeding on her, because it is menstruation blood that is caused by illness, surgery, stress or falls, so she is not prevented from performing the acts of worship (ibadah) imposed on her, and she is in the same ruling as immaculate women.

Based on that, the sharia ruling on the fasting of a woman who is mustahadhah is then a correct fasting, whether her fast is a desirable fast (nafilah) or an obligatory fast (fard), and this saying was taken by the Hanafi, Shafi'i and Hanbali jurists.

Since her fast is valid, the mustahadha will make up the days of her menstruation if she knows that, either by the time of the month's period, or by the correct distinction between the nature, color and smell of the unclean normal blood of haydh and the pure blood of istihadha.

== Intercourse ==
In Islam, having sexual intercourse between a husband and his mustahadha wife with blood in her vagina is considered harmful to both spouses.

Islamic law permits women to have penetrative vaginal intercourse during the days of purity, except that she (the mustahaadhat- the one with the menstrual overflow) must wash any traces of blood from her vagina before beginning sexual penetration with her husband.

== See also ==
- Heavy menstrual bleeding
- Intermenstrual bleeding
- Vaginal bleeding
- Gynecologic hemorrhage
- Ritual purity in Islam
- Islamic hygienical jurisprudence
- Najis
- Junub
- Ghusl
- Wudu
- Tayammum
- Women in Islam
- Woman prayer
- Hermeneutics of feminism in Islam
- Salah
- Thawab
- Menstruation in Islam
- Postpartum period
- Menstruation cycle
- Intimate parts in Islam
- Women as imams
- Culture and menstruation
- Islamic sexual jurisprudence
- Sexual intercourse
- Sexual penetration
- Religion and sexuality
