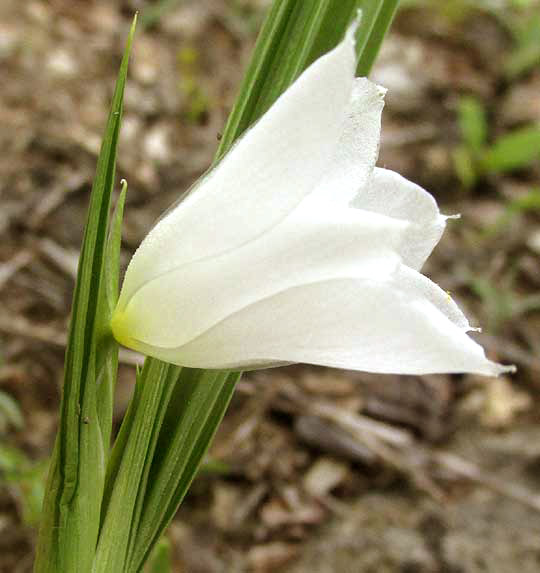
- Flower side view

Scientific classification
- Kingdom: Plantae
- Clade: Embryophytes
- Clade: Tracheophytes
- Clade: Angiosperms
- Clade: Monocots
- Order: Asparagales
- Family: Iridaceae
- Genus: Cipura
- Species: C. campanulata

Binomial name
- Cipura campanulata Ravenna

Synonyms
- Cipura inornata Ravenna

= Cipura campanulata =

Species of plant

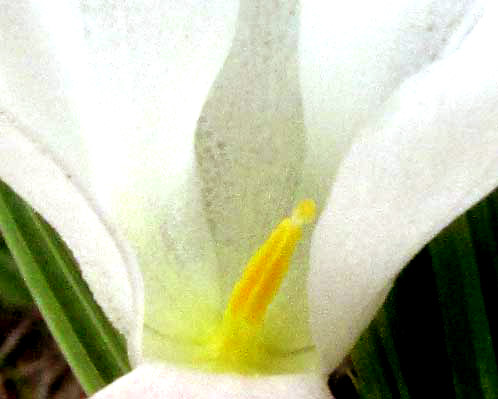
View of stamens with emerging style head

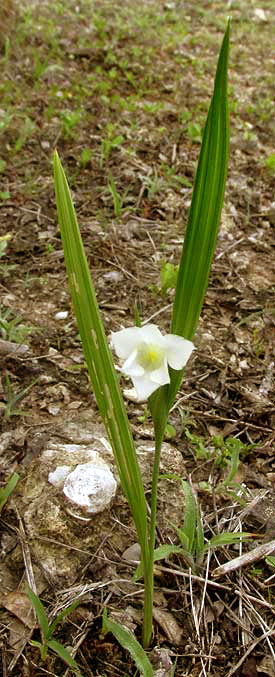
Plant in habitat

Cipura campanulata, with no commonly used English name, is an attractive species of wildflower in the American tropics. It belongs to the family Iridaceae.

== Discription ==
Cipura campanulata displays these noteworthy features:

- It arises from underground bulbs with papery coverings. Its 1-3 leaves are "pleated" lengthwise and reach up to 22 cm (8 3/4 in) long and 4 mm (1/8 in) mm wide.
- Inflorescences stand atop stems up to 40 cm (16 in) tall and consist of a compact grouping of 1-6 stemless, spathe-type bracts up to 3.5 cm (1 1/2 in) long, with each bract associated with one flower.
- Flowers have white tepals up 2.4 cm (0.94 in) long, and half that wide. Filaments of the 3 stamens are not fused with one another. The style is slightly 3-lobed at its tip.
- Fruits are capsules splitting open by three sutures through which numerous spherical to pear-shaped, dark brown to reddish brown seeds are released.

== Distribution ==
Cipura campanulata is widely distributed in Mexico, the Greater Antilles, Central America, and in South America south to Brazil, Paraguay, Uruguay, Bolivia and Peru.

== Habitat ==
In Mexico's Yucatan Peninsula, Cipura campanulata inhabits tropical deciduous and high-growing tropical and subtropical dry broadleaf forests with long dry seasons, and disturbed places like roadsides and weedy fields. Also in the Yucatan, images on this page show an individual in thin soil atop limestone in a coastal area sometimes flooded for extended periods. In Costa Rica it is frequent in the lowlands of Guanacaste province. In Columbia it's described as an intermediate pioneer during secondary succession in the dry forests of the Valle del Cauca.

== Ecology ==
Flowers of Cipura campanulata open early in the morning or a little later if it is cloudy.

== In traditional medicine ==
In Mexico's Yucatan Peninsula, Cipura campanulata is found in Mayan medicinal gardens, where the plant is used to treat vaginal hemmorrages and the mancha blanca, or "white spot," probably the vitiligo skin condition.

== Taxonomy ==
In 1964, "Pierfelice" Ravenna formally named and described Cipura campanulata in the Argentine journal Revista del Instituto Municipal de Botánica, Volume 2. That journal can be hard to locate. One confirmation that Ravenna published Cipura campanulata in that journal is a study listing his published works, and in that list the 1964 work in which Cipura campanulata was described is listed.

Taxonomic difficulties associated with Ravenna's contributions are not uncommon. Contents of one study addressing the situation are suggested by its title: "Pierfelice Ravenna (1938–2022)—Life, New Names, and Confusion." There we find that Ravenna described about 650 species but, "Unfortunately, the fate of his type specimens, a majority of which were located in his personal herbarium along with many loans from other herbaria, is not clearly known, but by all indications they were destroyed."

=== Etymology ===
The genus name Cipura is New Latin presumably based on a local common name for the species upon which the genus was based. Jean Baptiste Christophore Fusée Aublet, who in 1775 named the genus, is one of the pioneers of the science of ethnobotany and many of his genus names appear to be based on local plant names. In French or French Guianese Creole his Cipura collection was known as La cipure des marais ("marsh cipure"). His formal description was accompanied by an illustration, his Planche 13 (Plate 13), on which the plant was designated Cipura paludosa, thus introducing the genus Cipura. Aublet's manner of assigning generic names is well documented and commented on.

The species name campanulata is New Latin based on the Late Latin campana, for "bell-shaped." Pictures on this page show the bell-shaped corolla of Cipura campanulata.
