= Cypella elegans =

Scientific classification
- Kingdom: Plantae
- Clade: Tracheophytes
- Clade: Angiosperms
- Clade: Monocots
- Order: Asparagales
- Family: Iridaceae
- Genus: Cypella
- Species: C. elegans

Binomial name
- Cypella elegans Speg., 1917

Species of flowering plant

Cypella elegans is a herbaceous plant species in the genus Cypella endemic to Jujuy Province in northwestern Argentina .
