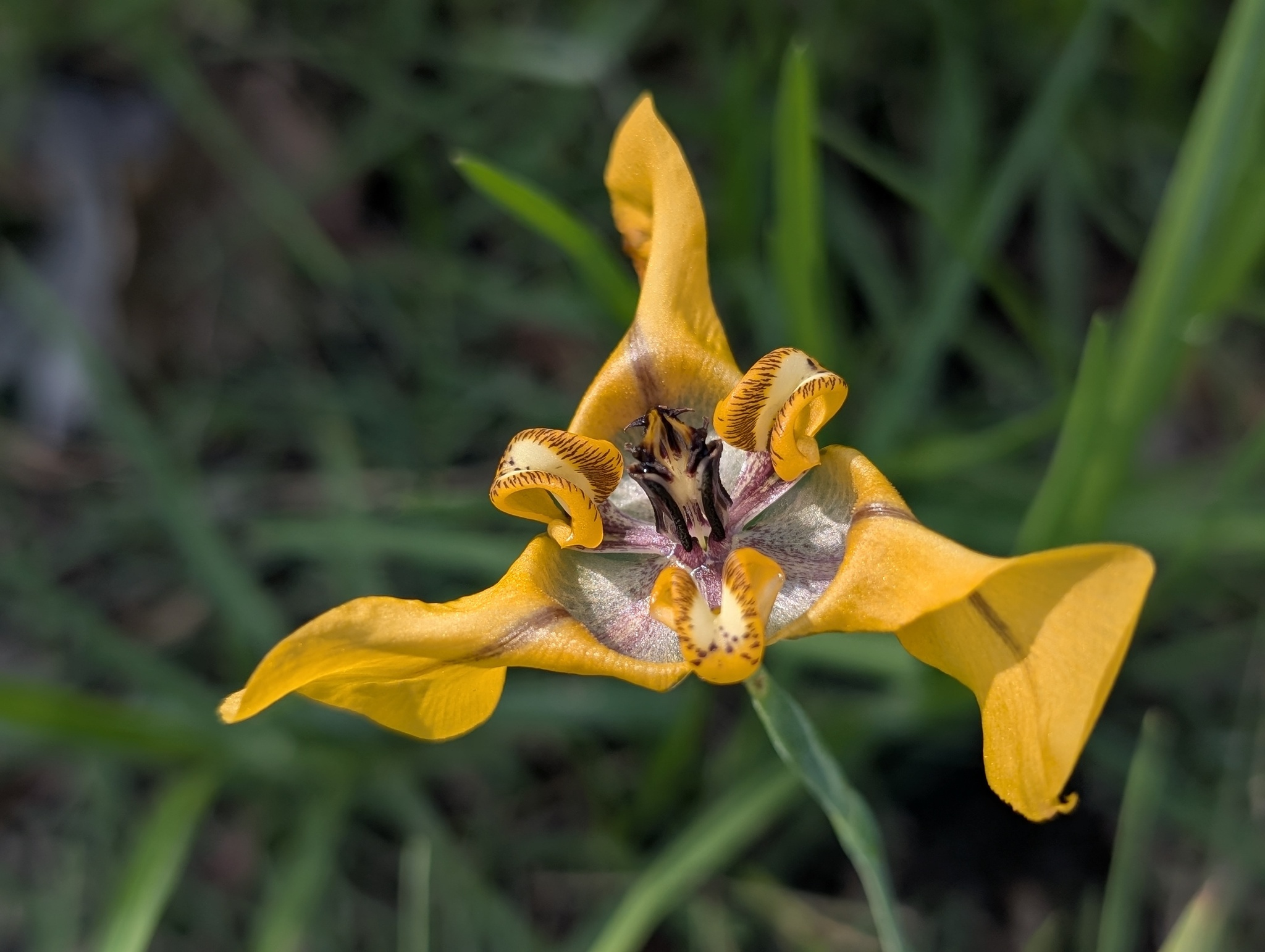
- Cypella herbertii in Uruguay

Scientific classification
- Kingdom: Plantae
- Clade: Embryophytes
- Clade: Tracheophytes
- Clade: Spermatophytes
- Clade: Angiosperms
- Clade: Monocots
- Order: Asparagales
- Family: Iridaceae
- Subfamily: Iridoideae
- Tribe: Tigridieae
- Genus: Cypella; Herb.

Type species
- Cypella herbertii (Lindley) Herbert

Synonyms
- Kelissa Ravenna; Onira Ravenna; Polia Ten.

= Cypella =

Genus of flowering plants

Cypella is a genus of herbaceous, perennial and bulbous plants in the family Iridaceae. It is distributed in South America, from Peru and Brazil to northern Argentina. The genus name is likely derived from the Greek word kyphella, meaning "hollow of the ear", and alludes to the shape of the inner tepals.

Species

Based on DNA and morphological features, the South American genera Kelissa and Onira are now included in Cypella.

- Cypella amambaica Ravenna, Onira 12: 4 (2009). Paraguay
- Cypella aquatilis Ravenna, Nordic J. Bot. 1: 489 (1981). S. Brazil.
- Cypella armosa Ravenna, Wrightia 7: 20 (1981). Paraguay to NE. Argentina.
- Cypella boliviana Huaylla, Kew Bull. 67: 297 (2012). Bolivia
- Cypella brasiliensis (Baker) Roitman & J.A.Castillo, Darwiniana 45: 238 (2007). southern Brazil
- Cypella catharinensis Ravenna, Onira 10: 39 (2005). Brazil (Santa Catarina).
- Cypella craterantha Ravenna, Revista Inst. Munic. Bot. 2: 52 (1964). Peru (Cajamarca).
- Cypella crenata (Vell.) Ravenna, Bol. Soc. Argent. Bot. 10: 312 (1965). Brazil (SE. Minas Gerais to São Paulo).
- Cypella curuzupensis Ravenna, Wrightia 7: 19 (1981). Paraguay.
- Cypella discolor Ravenna, Wrightia 7: 16 (1981). S. Brazil.
- Cypella elegans Speg., Physis (Buenos Aires) 2: 43 (1917). Argentina (Jujuy Province).
- Cypella exilis Ravenna, Nordic J. Bot. 1: 492 (1981). E. & S. Brazil to NE. Argentina.
- Cypella fucata Ravenna, Wrightia 7: 18 (1981). S. Brazil to NE. Uruguay.
- Cypella geniculata (Klatt) Ravenna, Revista Inst. Munic. Bot. 2: 53 (1964). Brazil.
- Cypella hauthalii (Kuntze) R.C.Foster, Contr. Gray Herb. 171: 23 (1950). SE. Paraguay to Argentina (Corrientes, Misiones).
- Cypella herbertii (Lindl.) Herb., Bot. Mag. 53: t. 2637 (1826). S. Brazil to NE. Argentina.
- Cypella laeta Ravenna, Wrightia 7: 13 (1981). NE. Argentina.
- Cypella lapidosa Ravenna, Wrightia 7: 21 (1981). Argentina (Corrientes).
- Cypella laxa Ravenna, Wrightia 7: 15 (1981). S. Brazil.
- Cypella luteogibbosa Deble, Phytotaxa 71: 60 (2012). Rio Grande do Sul
- Cypella magnicristata Deble, Phytotaxa 71: 63 (2012). Rio Grande do Sul
- Cypella mandonii Rusby, Mem. Torrey Bot. Club 6: 125 (1896). Bolivia.
- Cypella oreophila Speg., Physis (Buenos Aires) 2: 44 (1917). NW. Argentina.
- Cypella osteniana Beauverd, Bull. Soc. Bot. Genève 14: 165 (1922 publ. 1923). Uruguay.
- Cypella pabstiana Ravenna, Wrightia 7: 18 (1981). Brazil (Paraná).
- Cypella pusilla (Link & Otto) Benth. & Hook.f. ex B.D.Jacks., Index Kew. 1: 689 (1893). S. Brazil.
- Cypella suffusa Ravenna, Onira 12: 1 (2009). Argentina (Misiones Province)
- Cypella trimontina Ravenna, Onira 12: 2 (2009). Argentina (Corrientes Province)
- Cypella unguiculata (Baker) Roitman & J.A.Castillo - Uruguay, Rio Grande do Sul
- Cypella yatayphila Ravenna, Onira 12: 3 (2009). Argentina (Entre Ríos Province)

formerly included

- Cypella gigantea Klatt = Phalocallis coelestis (Lehm.) Ravenna

== Bibliography ==
- Flora Brasiliensis *Brazilian species of Cypella
- Dimitri, M. 1987. Enciclopedia Argentina de Agricultura y Jardinería. Tomo I. Descripción de plantas cultivadas. Editorial ACME S.A.C.I., Buenos AIres.
- Roitman, G & Castillo, A. Novedades en el género Cypella. Bol. Soc. Argent. de Botánica 38: 337-339 (2003).
