= Chorionic bump =

- Other names: chorionic bulge
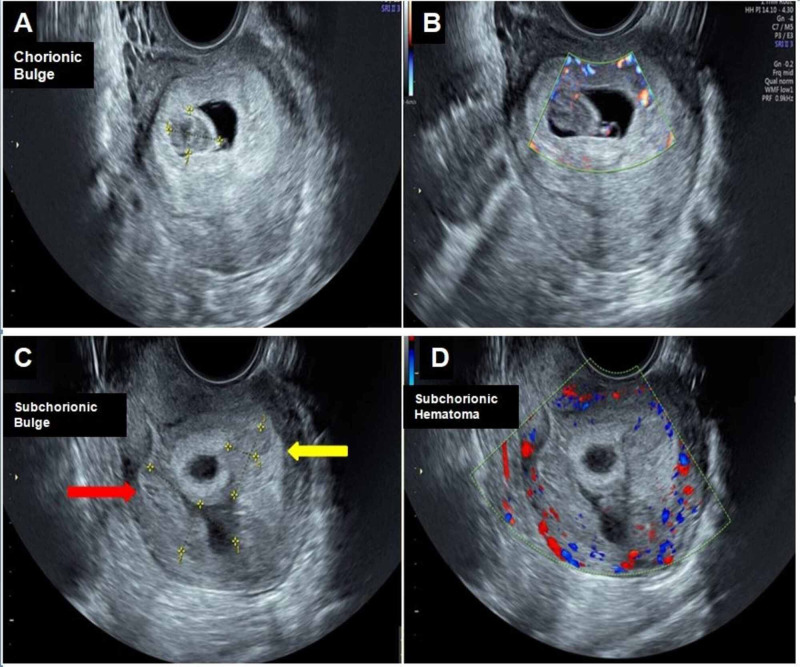
- Specialty: Obstetrics
- Usual onset: During pregnancy
- Risk factors: Use of assisted reproductive technology
- Prognosis: Higher rate of miscarriage
- Frequency: 1.5-7 per 1,000 pregnancies

Chorionic bump is a rare medical condition defined as an irregular, convex bulge or protrusion from the choriodecidual surface into the gestational sac. It is medically defined as a separate entity from a chorionic hematoma.

Identification of a chorionic bump in early first trimester pregnancy represents a significant risk factor for pregnancy loss, given a live birth rate of less than 50%. The incidence rate for chorionic bump is estimated to be between 1.5 and 7 per 1000 pregnancies.

== Cause and diagnosis ==
It is believed that chorionic bump can start as a hematoma in the intervillous space. Additionally, Infertility treatments may be associated with increased likelihood of chorionic bump.

== Prognosis and treatment ==
Existing literature suggests that chorionic bump causes first trimester pregnancy loss and doubles the miscarriage rate as compared to having no risk factors.
