= Cervical ectropion =

Presence of internal cells of the cervical canal outside the cervix

- Other names: Cervical eversion
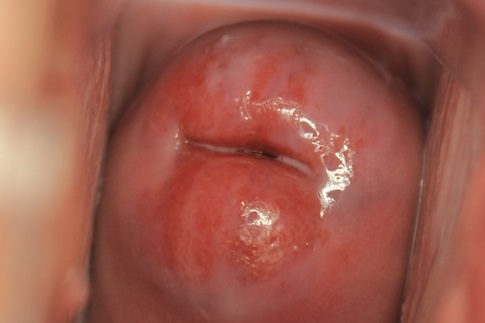
- Cervical ectropion
- Specialty: Gynecology

Cervical ectropion is a condition in which the cells from the 'inside' of the cervical canal, known as glandular cells (or columnar epithelium), are present on the 'outside' of the vaginal portion of the cervix. The cells on the 'outside' of the cervix are typically squamous epithelial cells. Where the two cells meet is called the transformation zone, also known as the stratified squamous epithelium. Cervical ectropion can be grossly indistinguishable from early cervical cancer and must be evaluated by a physician to determine risks and prognosis. It may be found incidentally when a vaginal examination (or pap smear test) is done. The area may look red because the glandular cells are red. While many women are born with cervical ectropion, it can be caused by a number of reasons, such as:

- Hormonal changes, meaning it can be common in young women
- Using oral contraceptives
- Pregnancy.

== Signs and symptoms ==
Cervical ectropion can be associated with excessive, non-purulent vaginal discharge due to the increased surface area of columnar epithelium containing mucus-secreting glands as well as intermenstrual bleeding (bleeding outside of regular menses). It may also give rise to post-coital bleeding, as fine blood vessels present within the columnar epithelium are easily traumatized.

== Causes ==
Cervical ectropion is a normal phenomenon, especially in the ovulatory phase in younger women, during pregnancy, and in women taking oral contraceptive, which increases the total estrogen level in the body. It also may be a congenital problem by the persistence of the squamocolumnar junction which is normally present prior to birth.

Mucopurulent cervicitis may increase the size of the cervical ectropion.

== Mechanism ==
The squamocolumnar junction, where the columnar secretory epithelium of the endocervical canal meets the stratified squamous covering of the ectocervix, is located at the external os before puberty. As estrogen levels rise during puberty, the cervical os opens, exposing the endocervical columnar epithelium onto the ectocervix. This area of columnar cells on the ectocervix forms an area that is red and raw in appearance called an ectropion (cervical erosion). It is then exposed to the acidic environment of the vagina and, through a process of squamous metaplasia, transforms into stratified squamous epithelium.

== Treatment ==
Usually no treatment is indicated for clinically asymptomatic cervical ectropions. Hormonal therapy may be indicated for symptomatic erosion. If it becomes troublesome to the patient, it can be treated by discontinuing oral contraceptives, cryotherapy treatment, or by using ablation treatment under local anesthetic. Ablation involves using a preheated probe (100 °C) to destroy 3–4 mm of the epithelium. In post-partum erosion, observation and re-examination are necessary for 3 months after labour.
