= Women's prayer in Islam =

Woman prayer
- Official name: صلاة المرأة، صلاة النساء
- Observed by: Muslims
- Type: Islamic
- Significance: A Muslim prayer offered to God by women.
- Observances: Sunnah prayers, Salah times
- Related to: Salah, Nafl prayer, Five Pillars of Islam, Islamic prayers

In Islam, the Woman prayer (Arabic: صلاة المرأة) represents the peculiarities, specificities and characteristics of the Islamic prayer (salat) that is performed by a woman.

== Presentation ==
The prayer that a woman performs in Islam to draw close to God is considered equal to the prayer a man performs.

== See also ==
- Women in Islam
- Hermeneutics of feminism in Islam
- Menstruation in Islam
- Hijab
- Intimate parts in Islam
- Women as imams
