= Early pregnancy bleeding =

- Other names: First trimester bleeding, hemorrhage in early pregnancy
- Specialty: Obstetrics
- Complications: Hemorrhagic shock
- Causes: Ectopic pregnancy, threatened miscarriage, pregnancy loss, implantation bleeding, gestational trophoblastic disease, polyps, cervical cancer
- Diagnostic method: Typically includes speculum examination, ultrasound, hCG
- Treatment: Depends on the underlying cause
- Frequency: ~30% of pregnancies

Early pregnancy bleeding (also called first trimester bleeding) is vaginal bleeding before 13 weeks of gestational age. Early pregnancy bleeding is common and can occur in up to 25% of pregnancies. Many individuals with first trimester bleeding experience no additional complications. However, 50% of pregnancies with first trimester bleeding end in miscarriage.

Common causes of early pregnancy bleeding include miscarriage, ectopic pregnancy, and subchorionic hematomas. Other causes include implantation bleeding, gestational trophoblastic disease, cervical changes, or infections. Assessment of first trimester bleeding includes history and physical exam (including speculum examination), imaging using ultrasound, and lab work such as beta-hCG and ABO/Rh blood tests.

Treatment depends on the underlying cause. Emergent management is indicated for patients with significant blood loss or hemodynamic instability. Anti-D immune globulin is usually recommended in those who are Rh-negative. Early pregnancy loss can be treated with expectant management, medication, or surgical intervention. Ectopic pregnancy can be treated with medication or surgical management, although emergent intervention is needed if the pregnancy has ruptured.

== Possible causes ==
There are many different underlying conditions that can cause bleeding in early pregnancy. Pregnancy related causes in the first trimester include:

- Early pregnancy loss (also known as spontaneous abortion or miscarriage) refers to spontaneous ending of pregnancy during the first trimester (prior to 12 weeks 6 days gestation). It is the most common cause of early pregnancy bleeding and occurs in 10% of all pregnancies. Bleeding may be accompanied by uterine cramping. Miscarriages are often further subcategorized but all types can present with early pregnancy bleeding:
  - Threatened miscarriage: presents with symptoms such as vaginal bleeding and uterine cramping suggesting early pregnancy loss. However, upon examination the cervical os (uterine opening) is closed and ultrasound finds a viable fetus.
  - Incomplete miscarriage: this occurs when pregnancy loss has been confirmed, however, the cervical os is still open and products of conception (fetal/placental tissue, etc.) remain inside the uterus.
  - Complete miscarriage: all the products of conception have passed on their own without intervention (surgery, medicine).
  - Septic miscarriage: early pregnancy loss complicated by infection. Symptoms such as fever, chills, vaginal discharge may accompany vaginal bleeding.
- Ectopic pregnancy refers to a pregnancy outside the uterus, most commonly in the fallopian tube. It occurs in 2% of all pregnancies but can be fatal if the ectopic pregnancy ruptures. Vaginal bleeding may be associated with pelvic or lower back or abdominal pain.
- Implantation bleeding is light bleeding or spotting that occurs when a fertilized egg implants into the uterus, typically 10 to 14 days after ovulation. 1 in 4 pregnancies experience implantation bleeding. It is shorter and lighter than a menstrual period and is not a concerning cause of early pregnancy bleeding.
- Subchorionic hematoma is the pooling of blood (hematoma) between the chorion (a membrane surrounding the fetus) and the uterine wall. Individuals may have vaginal bleeding or it may be found incidentally during routine obstetric imaging. Most subchorionic hematomas resolve without intervention but in some cases they can increase risk for pregnancy complications such as preterm delivery, miscarriage, and placental abruption.
- Gestational trophoblastic disease (GTD) refers to tumors that can develop following pregnancy. Most of these tumors are benign (noncancerous) but some are malignant (cancerous). GTD is rare with occurrence rates reported as 1-2 per 1000 pregnancies in North America and Europe.

Other causes of early pregnancy bleeding include the following:

- Cervical changes: during pregnancy, more blood vessels develop in the cervix which can cause light bleeding after events such as sex, pelvic exams, and pap smears. Cervical polyps can also bleed during pregnancy.
- Infections such as sexually transmitted infections (STIs) (chlamydia, gonorrhea) or urinary tract infections can sometimes cause light bleeding.

Conditions such as placenta praevia, vasa praevia, placental abruption, uterine rupture, and bloody show can also cause obstetric bleeding, but typically present later in pregnancy during the second and third trimester. For more information on second and third trimester causes of bleeding, see obstetrical bleeding.

== Pathophysiology ==
Early pregnancy bleeding is usually from a maternal source rather than a fetal one. The maternal source may be a disruption in the vessels of the decidua or a lesion in the cervix or vagina. In the earlier stages of pregnancy, the cervix can be vulnerable to bleeding as new blood vessels are being grown. Vasa praevia is a rare condition that can result in bleeding from the fetoplacental circulation. Vasa praevia happens most often when the umbilical cord grows in a way that it directly enters the membrane, and therefore blood vessels that are unprotected by the umbilical cord or placental tissue can rupture and lead to bleeding. Another common source of bleeding can be due to abnormal development of the embryo. The most common early fetal abnormality is abnormal number of chromosomes causing loss of the pregnancy and bleeding.

== Diagnostic approach ==
Initial assessment

Prior to undergoing a detailed evaluation, initial assessment of early pregnancy bleeding will focus on determining the appropriate setting to receive care and level of urgency required for the specific patient. Heavy bleeding with associated symptoms such as severe abdominal or pelvic pain, lightheadedness or dizziness, or increased heart rate may indicate the need for more urgent evaluation in an emergency department setting. Bleeding that is heavier than a menstrual period or associated with passage of clots or pregnancy tissue, lightheadedness, or pelvic discomfort is associated with increased risks of ectopic pregnancy and miscarriage. Stable patients with light bleeding and no additional symptoms are typically suitable to be evaluated in a number of different healthcare settings.

History

Relevant history includes determining the gestational age of the fetus and quantifying the bleeding. Important characteristics to consider are the onset, duration, and volume of bleeding. Bleeding is considered heavy when an individual soaks more than 1 pad per hour for more than 2 hours with or without passage of large clots or pregnancy tissue. Spotting refers to very light bleeding that is no more than spots of brown, pink, or red blood on underwear or toilet paper when an individual wipes. It typically does not require menstrual products like pads or tampons and it will not fill a panty liner if used. Associated symptoms, risk factors for specific pregnancy conditions (miscarriage, ectopic pregnancy), and additional medical history should also be considered.

Physical examination

The physical examination includes assessing vital signs (heart rate, blood pressure, respiratory rate, temperature) and performing an abdominal and pelvic examination. Signs of hemodynamic instability (low blood pressure, abnormal heart rate, confusion, shortness of breath) or peritonitis (abdominal tenderness, fever, vomiting, loss of appetite) require emergent intervention. A pelvic examination may reveal non-obstetric causes of bleeding such as bleeding from the vagina or cervix. It may also show visible products of conception suggestive of an incomplete miscarriage.

Imaging

If the person is stable and a pelvic exam does not reveal the source of bleeding, ultrasonography is generally recommended to assess fetal location and viability. Ultrasound using a transvaginal probe is the preferred method of imaging when evaluating first trimester bleeding. Ultrasound using an abdominal probe can sometimes complement the findings with the transvaginal probe, but it is not preferred. Abdominal ultrasound can be used alone in specific cases, likely when the patient is at later gestational age and the pregnancy is larger in size. CT and MRI are generally not recommended as first-line imaging methods for early pregnancy bleeding due to ionizing radiation exposure (CT) and inferiority to ultrasound imaging (MRI).

Labs

Beta-hCG is a pregnancy hormone produced by the placenta that can be helpful in assessing fetal viability in the presence of early pregnancy bleeding. hCG levels are expected to double every 48 hours in the early weeks of pregnancy, which indicates that the fetus is developing appropriately. The hormone levels typically peak around 10 weeks and will begin to decrease until 16 weeks gestation. After 16 weeks, the level of hCG will plateau and remain at a constant level until delivery. hCG levels that are lower than expected (levels are not doubling every 48 hours) suggests a non-viable pregnancy (miscarriage) or ectopic pregnancy. hCG levels that are abnormally elevated (>100,000 mIU/mL) in early pregnancy can be due to gestational trophoblastic disease.

A provider may also order blood tests to assess for ABO and Rh-antibody blood type due to the risk for Rh-d isoimmunization. These tests are typically completed as routine prenatal lab work. However, if a pregnant individual presents with early pregnancy bleeding and has not previously completed blood testing, they will likely be ordered during workup of the bleeding. Rh-d isoimmunization occurs when a mother with Rh(-) blood is exposed to Rh(+) blood. The mother then creates antibodies that can attack the Rh(+) blood of her fetus and cause hemolytic disease of the newborn, with outcomes ranging from mild anemia of the newborn to a serious condition called hydrops fetalis.

Follow-up

If the viability of an intrauterine pregnancy is uncertain after initial assessment, repeat ultrasonography coupled with laboratory measurement of progesterone and/or serial hCG can be helpful. The absence of either intrauterine or ectopic pregnancy on imaging is suggestive of a complete early pregnancy loss (if the pregnancy was previously seen on imaging) or a pregnancy of unknown location (if the pregnancy was not previously seen on imaging).

== Management ==
Initial management

The management of early pregnancy bleeding depends on its severity and cause. Emergent evaluation and treatment may be indicated for individuals presenting with significant blood loss and signs of hemodynamic instability (low blood pressure, increased heart rate, confusion).

Individuals with significant first-trimester bleeding should have a red blood cell Rh-antibody screen. National guidelines in the US, UK, and Canada state that women with Rh-negative blood should receive an appropriate dose of anti-D immune globulin to prevent RhD isoimmunization in the following scenarios: following delivery of a Rh(+) infant, after sensitizing events, or all Rh(-) mothers in the 3rd trimester. Sensitizing events are pregnancy related events that can lead to possible exposure of Rh(+) blood, including: ectopic pregnancy, miscarriage, or molar pregnancy (gestational trophoblastic disease). Anti-d immune globulin administration in women who present with early pregnancy bleeding due to threatened miscarriage and a viable fetus is controversial and a single recommendation does not exist.

Management of early pregnancy loss

Early pregnancy loss can be treated with expectant management (waiting for miscarriage to complete spontaneously with no intervention), management with medication, or surgical intervention. For women who are stable with no underlying medical conditions, shared decision making between provider and patient should be used as all options provide effective treatment with minimal differences in efficacy rates and risk.

- Expectant management: If appropriate time is given for resolution of symptoms/complete passage of pregnancy (up to 8 weeks), 80% of women who utilize this option will complete the miscarriage without intervention.
- Medical management: Misoprostol alone or combined Mifepristone-Misoprostol (when available) is the first line recommendation for medical management of early pregnancy loss. The majority of women using this option will experience resolution of pregnancy loss within 3 days. Repeat dosing can be administered if failure to complete after first dose.
- Surgical management: This option provides the quickest resolution and is the necessary option for women presenting with hemorrhage, hemodynamic instability, or infection. It may also be utilized for women with underlying medical conditions that complicate expectant or medical management, such as severe anemia, bleeding disorders, or cardiovascular disease. Surgical management of early pregnancy loss is most often completed as suction curettage, which can often be completed as an outpatient procedure in an office setting.

Management of ectopic pregnancy

Ectopic pregnancies that have ruptured require emergent management and should be treated immediately with surgical intervention. When an ectopic pregnancy has not ruptured and the patient is overall stable, shared decision making between provider and patient can be used to determine medical versus surgical management. Administration of intramuscular methotrexate is the first-line option for medical management. This is followed by close monitoring of b-hCG levels 4 and 7 days after injection. B-hCG levels should decrease by at least 15% between those two timepoints. Salpingostomy (removing pregnancy without removing fallopian tube) or salpingectomy (removing pregnancy and fallopian tube) are surgical options that will be considered based on a variety of patient factors (contraindications to methotrexate, significant blood loss, signs of rupture) or if medical management has failed.

== Epidemiology ==
Early pregnancy bleeding is a common occurrence, with up to 25% of pregnancies experiencing some amount of bleeding in the first trimester. Many of those who experience early bleeding continue to carry healthy pregnancies. However, about 50% of individuals with early bleeding lose their pregnancy to miscarriage. The presence of bleeding in the first trimester can also increase risk for other serious pregnancy complications such as premature rupture of membranes, preterm delivery, delivery of infant with low birth weight, placental abruption, or placenta previa.

Risk factors for early pregnancy bleeding are specific to the underlying cause of the bleeding. Some condition specific risk factors include:

- Miscarriage: history of miscarriage, age over 35 years old, smoking, conditions affecting the structure of the uterus (fibroids, abnormal shape of the uterus).
- Ectopic pregnancy: history of ectopic pregnancy, IUD (intrauterine device) within the uterus at time of conception, pelvic inflammatory disease, or history of abdominal surgery.
- Subchorionic hematoma: history of uterine trauma or infection, conditions affecting the structure of the uterus, history of miscarriage or recurrent pregnancy loss, high blood pressure.
