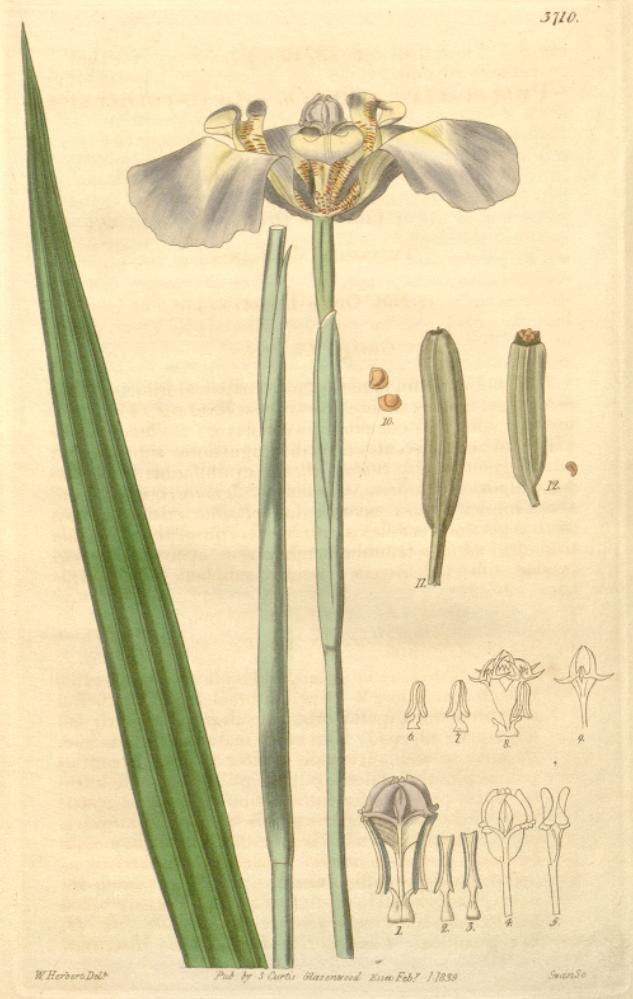
- Illustration in Curtis's botanical magazine vol. 65 NS. 12 tabl. 3710

Scientific classification
- Kingdom: Plantae
- Clade: Tracheophytes
- Clade: Angiosperms
- Clade: Monocots
- Order: Asparagales
- Family: Iridaceae
- Genus: Phalocallis; Herb.

Type species
- Phalocallis coelestis (Lehm.) Ravenna

Synonyms
- Cipura coelestis (Lehm.) Heynh.; Cipura northiana var. coelestis (Lehm.) C.Morren; Cypella coelestis (Lehm.) Diels; Marica coelestis Lehm.; Cypella gigantea Klatt; Cypella plumbea Lindl.; Phalocallis gigantea (Klatt) Kuntze; Phalocallis plumbea (Lindl.) Herb.; Polia platensis Herb. ex Speg.; Tigridia azurea Anon.; Tigridia coelestis Lehm.; Tigridia exaltata Jacques

= Phalocallis =

Genus of flowering plants

Phalocallis is a genus of flowering plants in the family Iridaceae. It was first described as a genus in 1839. It contains only one recognized species, Phalocallis coelestis, native to Paraná State in southern Brazil, and also in northeastern Argentina.
