= Irregular menstruation =

- Other names: Irregular cycles, irregular periods
- Specialty: Gynecology
- Symptoms: Change in the flow of menstrual bleeding, Change in the duration of periods, Change in menstrual cycle.
- Diagnostic method: Based on physical examination
- Medication: birth control pills

Irregular menstruation is a menstrual disorder whose manifestations include irregular cycle lengths as well as metrorrhagia (vaginal bleeding between expected periods). The possible causes of irregular menstruation may vary. The common factors of it are related to lifestyle, such as stress, body weight, and smoking status. Several studies indicate that COVID-19 vaccine of any type may disrupt the menstrual cycle, although only momentarily. This side effect should resolve on its own in the following month.

== Irregular cycles or periods ==
Irregular cycles or irregular periods is an abnormal variation in length of menstrual cycles. A female usually experiences cycle length variations of up to eight days between the shortest and longest cycle lengths. Lengths ranging between eight and 20 days are considered moderately irregular. Variation of 21 days or more is considered very irregular.

Alternatively, a single menstruation cycle may be defined as irregular if it is less than 24 days or more than 38 days. If they are regularly shorter than 21 days or longer than 36 (or 35) days, the condition is termed polymenorrhea or oligomenorrhea, respectively.

Additionally, irregular menstruation is common in adolescence. A regular menstrual cycle can be set within a year of menarche. However, other studies suggest that it can take anywhere between 2 and 7 years to establish regularity after the first menses.

== Other types ==
Other types of conditions that can be referred to by "irregular menstruation" include:

- Metrorrhagia, which generally refers to vaginal bleeding that occurs between the expected menstrual periods. The distinction between irregular cycle lengths and metrorrhagia is not always clear. It may depend on whether the bleeding is regarded as marking the menstrual period (favoring the term "irregular cycles") or being separate from it (favoring the term "metrorrhagia").
- Oligomenorrhea generally refers to infrequent menstruation, More strictly, it is menstrual periods occurring at intervals of greater than 35 days, with only four to nine periods in a year. Menstrual periods should have been regularly established before the development of infrequent flow and often (but not always) involves irregular intervals. In contrast to "irregular cycles", the interval between one cycle and the next may be consistent but can be regarded as "irregular" compared to the cycle length of a female without oligomenorrhea. Women with oligomenorrhea often have irregular cycles as well.
- Polymenorrhea is the medical term for cycles with intervals of 21 days or fewer. It can be regarded as the opposite of oligomenorrhea.
