= Intermenstrual bleeding =

Vaginal bleeding at irregular intervals between expected menstrual periods

- Other names: Metrorrhagia, irregular vaginal bleeding
- Specialty: Gynecology
- Symptoms: Bleeding in between periods
- Risk factors: Family history
- Diagnostic method: Based on physical examination
- Differential diagnosis: Irregular menstruation

Intermenstrual bleeding (IMB), or metrorrhagia, is abnormal vaginal bleeding at irregular intervals between expected menstrual periods. It may be associated with bleeding with sexual intercourse. The term metrorrhagia, in which metro- means uterus and -rrhagia means abnormal flow, is no longer recommended.

In some women, menstrual spotting between periods occurs as a normal and harmless part of ovulation. Some women experience acute mid-cycle abdominal pain around the time of ovulation (sometimes referred to by the German term for this phenomenon, mittelschmerz). This may also occur at the same time as menstrual spotting.

The term breakthrough bleeding (or breakthrough spotting) is usually used for women using hormonal contraceptives, such as IUDs or oral contraceptives. It refers to bleeding or spotting between any expected withdrawal bleeding, or at any time if none is expected. If spotting continues beyond the first 3–4 cycles of oral contraceptive use, a woman should have her prescription adjusted to a pill containing higher estrogen:progesterone ratio by either increasing the estrogen dose or decreasing the relative progesterone dose.

Besides the aforementioned physiologic forms, IMB may also represent abnormal uterine bleeding and be a sign of an underlying disorder, such as a hormone imbalance, endometriosis, uterine fibroids, uterine cancer, or vaginal cancer.

If the bleeding is repeated and heavy, it can cause significant iron-deficiency anemia.

== Causes ==
Intermittent spotting between periods can result from any of numerous reproductive system disorders:

Neoplasia:

- Cervical cancer
- Uterine cancer
- Vaginal cancer
- Endometrial cancer
- Primary fallopian tube cancer
- Ovarian cancer

Inflammation:

- Cervicitis
- Endometritis
- Vaginitis
- Sexually Transmitted Infections
- Pelvic inflammatory disease

Endometrial abnormalities:

- Endometriosis
- Adenomyosis
- Uterine leiomyomas
- Endometrial hyperplasia
- Polyps

Endocrinological causes:

- Hormone imbalance
- Dysfunctional uterine bleeding
- Diets which induce ketosis, such as the Atkins diet
- Polyendocrine metabolic ovarian syndrome

Bleeding disorders:

- Von Willebrand Disease
- Pancytopenia due to leukemia

Drug induced:

- Use of progestin-only contraceptives, such as Depo Provera
- Change in oral contraception
- Overdose of anticoagulant medication or Aspirine abuse

Traumatic causes:

- Automutilation
- Sexual abuse or rape

Related to pregnancy:

- Implantation bleeding
- Ectopic pregnancy
- (Incomplete) miscarriage

Other causes:

- Enlarged uterus with menorrhea

== Breakthrough bleeding ==
Breakthrough bleeding (BTB) is any of various forms of vaginal bleeding, usually referring to mid-cycle bleeding in users of combined oral contraceptives as attributed to insufficient estrogens. It may also occur with other hormonal contraceptives. Sometimes, breakthrough bleeding is classified as abnormal and thereby as a form of IMB.

In the context of hemophilia, the term describes a bleeding that occurs while a patient is on prophylaxis.

=== Presentation ===
The bleeding is usually light, often referred to as "spotting," though a few people may experience heavier bleeding.

It is estimated that breakthrough bleeding affects around 25% of combined oral contraceptive pill (COCP) users during the initial 3 to 4 months of use, it then usually resolves on its own.

=== Mechanism ===
Breakthrough bleeding is commonly due to 4 factors: physiologic effects of OCs on the endometrium, OC-related parameters, (dose, formulation, and regimen), patient behavior, (compliance, using concomitant medications, and smoking) and benign or malignant pathology.

=== Treatment ===
Breakthrough bleeding that does not resolve on its own is a common reason for women to switch to different pill formulations, or to switch to a non-hormonal method of birth control.

== See also ==
- Menorrhagia, or heavy menstrual bleeding (HMB)
- Menometrorrhagia, or heavy irregular menstrual bleeding (HIMB)
- Withdrawal bleeding
- Culture and menstruation
- Istihadha
