= Cervicitis =

Inflammation of the uterine cervix

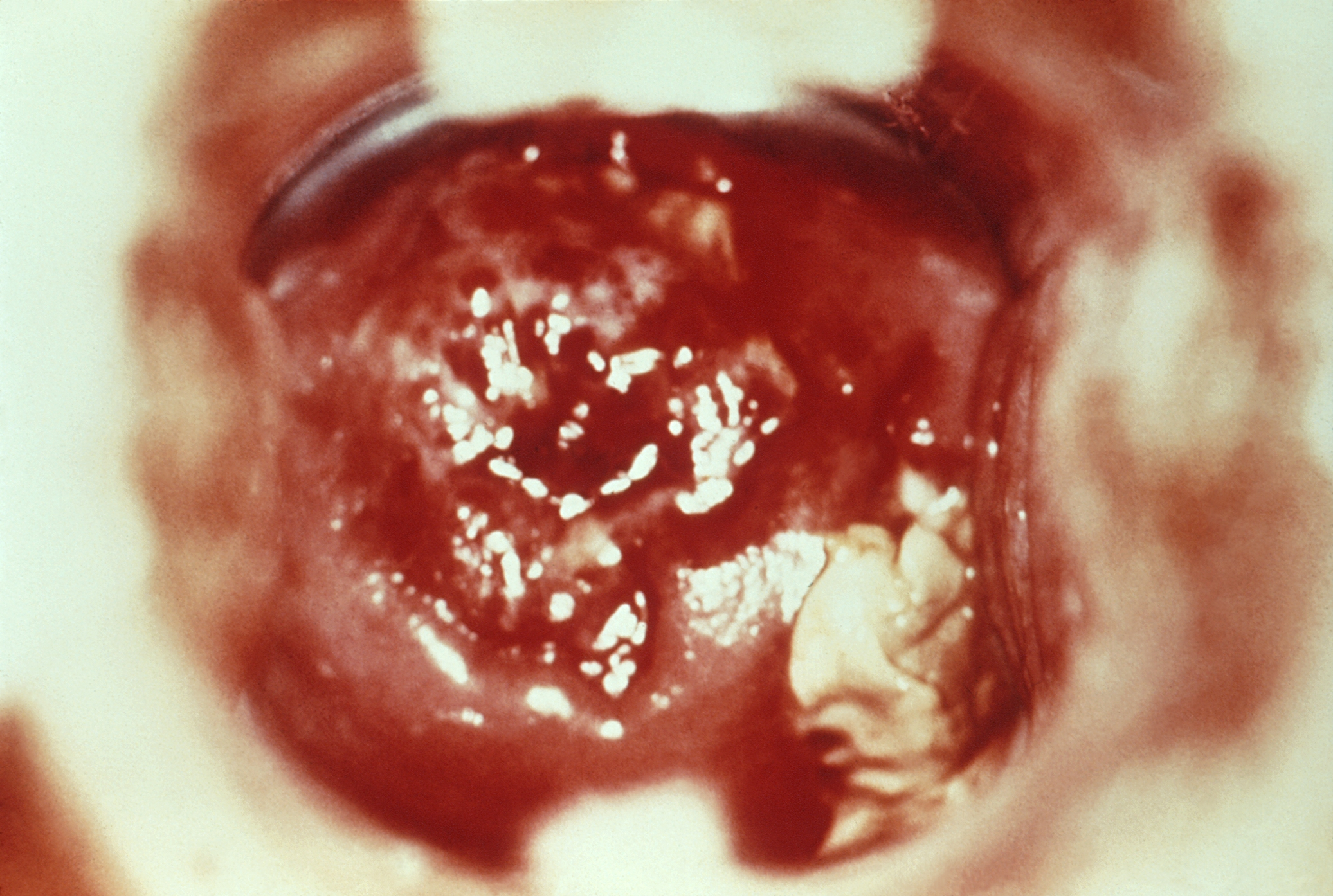
- HSV cervicitis
- Specialty: Gynaecology

Cervicitis is inflammation of the uterine cervix. Cervicitis in women has many features in common with urethritis in men and many cases are caused by sexually transmitted infections. Non-infectious causes of cervicitis can include intrauterine devices, contraceptive diaphragms, and allergic reactions to spermicides or latex condoms. Cervicitis affects over half of all women during their adult life.

Cervicitis may ascend and cause endometritis and pelvic inflammatory disease (PID). Cervicitis may be acute or chronic.

== Symptoms and signs ==
Cervicitis may have no symptoms. If symptoms do manifest, they may include:

- Abnormal vaginal bleeding after intercourse after periods
- Unusual gray, white, or yellow vaginal discharge
- Painful sexual intercourse
- Pain in the vagina
- Pressure or heaviness in the pelvis
- Frequent, painful urination

== Causes ==
Cervicitis can be caused by any of a number of infections, of which the most common are chlamydia and gonorrhea, with chlamydia accounting for approximately 40% of cases. Other causes include Trichomonas vaginalis, herpes simplex virus, and Mycoplasma genitalium.

While sexually transmitted infections (STIs) are the most common cause of cervicitis, there are other potential causes as well. This includes vaginitis caused by bacterial vaginosis or Trichomonas vaginalis. This also includes a device inserted into the pelvic area (i.e. a cervical cap, IUD, pessary, etc.); an allergy to spermicides or latex in condoms; or, exposure to a chemical, for example while douching. Inflammation can also be idiopathic, where no specific cause is found. While IUDs do not cause cervicitis, active cervicitis is a contraindication to placing an IUD. If a person with an IUD develops cervicitis, it usually does not need to be removed, if the person wants to continue using it.

There are also certain behaviors that can place individuals at a higher risk for contracting cervicitis. High-risk sexual behavior, a history of STIs, many sexual partners, sex at an early age, and sexual partners who engage in high-risk sexual behavior or have had an STI can increase the likelihood of contracting cervicitis.

== Diagnosis ==
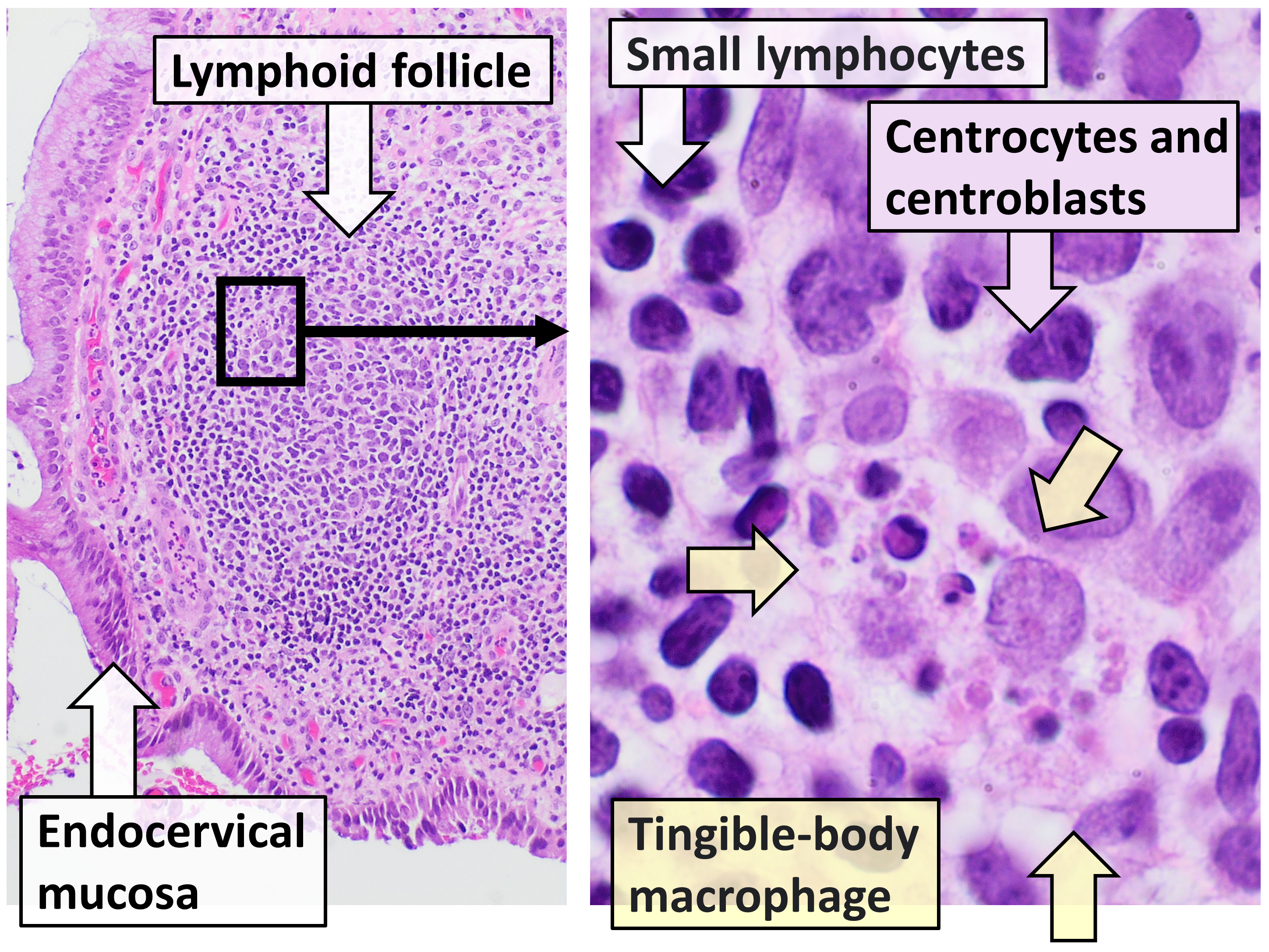
Histopathology of follicular cervicitis, H&E stain, with typical features. It is a form of chronic cervicitis, with various causes.

To diagnose cervicitis, a clinician will perform a pelvic exam. This exam includes a speculum exam with visual inspection of the cervix for abnormal discharge, which is usually purulent or bleeding from the cervix with little provocation. Swabs can be used to collect a sample of this discharge for inspection under a microscope and/or lab testing for gonorrhea, chlamydia, and Trichomonas vaginalis. A bimanual exam in which the clinician palpates the cervix to see if there is any associated pain should be done to assess for pelvic inflammatory disease.

== Prevention ==
The risk of contracting cervicitis from STIs can be reduced by using condoms during every sexual encounter. Condoms are effective against the spread of STIs like chlamydia and gonorrhea that cause cervicitis. Also, being in a long-term monogamous relationship with an uninfected partner can lower the risk of an STI.

Ensuring that foreign objects like tampons are properly placed in the vagina and following instructions how long to leave it inside, how often to change it, and/or how often to clean it can reduce the risk of cervicitis. In addition, avoiding potential irritants like douches and deodorant tampons can prevent cervicitis.

== Treatment ==
Non-infectious causes of cervicitis are primarily treated by eliminating or limiting exposure to the irritant. Antibiotics, usually azithromycin or doxycycline, or antiviral medications are used to treat infectious causes. Women at increased risk of sexually transmitted infections (i.e., less than 25 years of age and a new sexual partner, a sexual partner with other partners, or a sexual partner with a known sexually transmitted infection), should be treated presumptively for chlamydia and possibly gonorrhea, particularly if follow-up care cannot be ensured or diagnostic testing is not possible. For lower risk women, deferring treatment until test results are available is an option.

To reduce the risk of reinfection, women should abstain from sexual intercourse for seven days after treatment is started. Also, sexual partners (within the last sixty days) of anyone with infectious cervicitis should be referred for evaluation or treated through expedited partner therapy (EPT). EPT is the process by which a clinician treats the sexual partner of a patient diagnosed with a sexually transmitted infection without first meeting or examining the partner. Sexual partners should also avoid sexual intercourse until they and their partners are adequately treated.

Untreated cervicitis is also associated with an increased susceptibility to HIV infection. Women with infectious cervicitis should be tested for other sexually transmitted infections, including HIV and syphilis.

Cervicitis should be followed up. Women with a specific diagnosis of chlamydia, gonorrhea, or trichomonas should see a clinician in three months after treatment for repeat testing because they are at higher risk of getting reinfected, regardless of whether their sex partners were treated. Treatment in pregnant women is the same as those who are not pregnant.
