= Menstruation in Islam =

Restrictions placed on Muslims

Menstruation in Islam relates to various purity related restrictions in Islamic jurisprudence. The ḥayḍ (Arabic: حيض) is the religious state of menstruation in Islam. Classical fiqh distinguishes three types of female bleeding: ḥayḍ (menstruation), nifās (postpartum bleeding), and istiḥāḍa (irregular or prolonged bleeding). Each carries different rulings.

== Rulings during menstruation ==
=== Marital relations ===
The Qur'an makes specific mention of menstruation in al-Baqara 2:222:

And they ask you about menstruation. Say, "It is harm, so keep away from wives during menstruation. And do not approach them until they are pure. And when they have purified themselves, then come to them from where Allāh has ordained for you. Indeed, Allāh loves those who are constantly repentant and loves those who purify themselves.

The language is taken to imply that sexual relations during menstruation are prohibited.

Despite the verse saying to keep away from the women, various hadiths indicate that Muhammad considered this to refer only to sexual intercourse. A hadith narrated by the muhaddith Ibn Kathīr describes Muhammad's habits with his menstruating wives and demonstrates that Muhammad gave licence to all other forms of spousal intimacy. For example, Sahih al-Bukhari 297 mentions that Muhammad would lie on his wife Aisha’s lap and recite the Qur'an when she was on her menses.

=== Fasting and prayer ===
Women are required to perform ghusl or full ritual purification before resuming religious duties upon completion of their menstruation. Although the Qur'an doesn't mention fasting or praying during menstruation, both are forbidden according to hadiths. Muslim women that are going through menstrual bleeding are exempt from fasting during the Ramadan, but have to make them up after menstruation. On the other hand, while women should not pray during menstruation, they do not have to make up for the missed prayers during this period, as stated in Sunan ibn Majah 631. Hadiths are not considered as reliable as the Qur'an, but all of these hadiths are classified as being sahih, which means they can be trusted.

== Differences between legal schools ==
The four Sunni schools differ on the minimum and maximum duration of ḥayḍ. The Ḥanafī school sets the minimum at three days and maximum at ten. The Mālikī school allows up to fifteen days.

Ḥayḍ duration by legal school
School	Minimum	Maximum	Default assumed
Ḥanafī	3 days	10 days	10 days
Mālikī	No minimum	15 days	6–7 days
Shāfiʿī	1 day	15 days	6–7 days
Ḥanbalī	1 day	15 days	6–7 days

== See also ==
- Culture and menstruation
- Divorce in Islam
- Iddah
- Women's prayer in Islam
