= Vaginal bleeding =

- Sonohysterography performed because of postmenopausal bleeding. In serial images, polyps would be less mobile than the freely moving debris seen within the uterine cavity in the image.
- Specialty: Gynecology

Vaginal bleeding is any expulsion of blood from the vagina. This bleeding may originate from the uterus, vaginal wall, or cervix. Generally, it is either part of a normal menstrual cycle or is caused by hormonal or other problems of the reproductive system, such as abnormal uterine bleeding.

Regular monthly vaginal bleeding during the reproductive years, menstruation, is a normal physiologic process. During the reproductive years, bleeding that is excessively heavy (menorrhagia or heavy menstrual bleeding), occurs between monthly menstrual periods (intermenstrual bleeding), occurs more frequently than every 21 days (abnormal uterine bleeding), occurs too infrequently (oligomenorrhea), or occurs after vaginal intercourse (postcoital bleeding) should be evaluated.

The causes of abnormal vaginal bleeding vary by age, and such bleeding can be a sign of specific medical conditions ranging from hormone imbalances or anovulation to malignancy (cervical cancer, vaginal cancer or uterine cancer). In young children, or elderly adults with cognitive impairment, the source of bleeding may not be obvious, and may be from the urinary tract (hematuria) or the rectum rather than the vagina, although most adult women can identify the site of bleeding. When vaginal bleeding occurs in prepubertal children or in postmenopausal women, it always needs medical attention.

Vaginal bleeding during pregnancy can be normal, especially in early pregnancy. However, bleeding may also indicate a pregnancy complication that needs to be medically addressed. During pregnancy bleeding is usually, but not always, related to the pregnancy itself.

The treatment of vaginal bleeding is dependent on the specific cause, which can often be determined through a thorough history, physical, and medical testing.

== Etiology ==
The parameters for normal menstruation have been defined as a result of an international process designed to simplify terminologies and definitions for abnormalities of menstrual bleeding. The causes of abnormal vaginal bleeding vary by age.

=== Prepubertal ===
Bleeding in children is of concern if it occurs before the expected time of menarche and in the absence of appropriate pubertal development. Bleeding before the onset of pubertal development deserves evaluation. It could result from local causes or from hormonal factors. In children, it may be challenging to determine the source of bleeding, and "vaginal" bleeding may actually arise from the bladder or urethra, or from the rectum.

Vaginal bleeding in the first week of life after birth is a common observation, and pediatricians typically discuss this with new mothers at the time of hospital discharge. During childhood, one of the most common causes of vaginal bleeding is presence of a foreign body in the vagina which may be caused by normal self-exploration or can be indicative of sexual abuse. This is often associated with pelvic pain, foul discharge, or recurrent genitourinary infections. Other causes include trauma (either accidental or non accidental, i.e. child sexual abuse or molestation), urethral prolapse, vaginal infection (vaginitis), vulvar ulcers, vulvar skin conditions such as lichen sclerosus, and rarely, a tumor (benign or malignant vaginal tumors, or hormone-producing ovarian tumors). Hormonal causes include central precocious puberty, or peripheral precocious puberty (McCune–Albright syndrome), or primary hypothyroidism.

Genitourinary injury is also a common cause, and is often the most common cause of hospitalization or emergency department visits for prepubertal vaginal bleeding, comprising up to 45% of such cases. The most common genitourinary injury is the straddle injury, which often occurs during a fall, often on a sharp edge, and can cause lacerations between the labial folds.

While vaginal bleeding in children is typically alarming to parents, most causes are benign, although sexual abuse or tumor are particularly important to exclude. An examination under anesthesia (EUA) may be necessary to exclude a vaginal foreign body or tumor, although instruments designed for office hysteroscopy can sometimes be used in children with topical anesthesia for office vaginoscopy, precluding the need for sedation or general anesthesia and operating room time.

=== Premenopausal ===
==== Background ====
In premenopausal women, bleeding can be from the uterus, from vulvar or vaginal lesions, or from the cervix. A gynecologic examination can be performed to determine the source of bleeding. Bleeding may also occur as a result of a pregnancy complication, such as a spontaneous abortion (miscarriage), ectopic pregnancy, or abnormal growth of the placenta, even if the woman is not aware of the pregnancy. This possibility must be kept in mind with regard to diagnosis and management.

Generally, the causes of abnormal uterine bleeding in premenopausal women who are not pregnant include fibroids, polyps, hormonal disorders such as polyendocrine metabolic ovarian syndrome (PMOS), blood clotting disorders, and cancer. Infections such as cervicitis or pelvic inflammatory disease (PID) can also result in vaginal bleeding. Postcoital bleeding is bleeding that occurs after sexual intercourse. Lastly, a normal and common side effect of birth control includes vaginal spotting or bleeding.

==== Clinical guidelines (FIGO classification) ====
A more specific clinical guideline, called the PALM-COEIN system, has been developed by FIGO (International Federation of Gynecology and Obstetrics) to classify the causes of abnormal uterine bleeding. This acronym stands for Polyp, Adenomyosis, Leiomyoma, Malignancy and Hyperplasia, Coagulopathy, Ovulatory Disorders, Endometrial Disorders, Iatrogenic Causes, and Not Classified. The FIGO Menstrual Disorders Group, with input from international experts, recommended a simplified description of abnormal bleeding that discarded imprecise terms such as menorrhagia, metrorrhagia, hypermenorrhea, and dysfunctional uterine bleeding (DUB) in favor of plain English descriptions of bleeding that describe the vaginal bleeding in terms of cycle regularity, frequency, duration, and volume.

The PALM causes are related to uterine structural, anatomic, and histolopathologic causes that can be assessed with imaging techniques such as ultrasound or biopsy to view the histology of a lesion. The COEIN causes of abnormal bleeding are not related to structural causes.

PALM - Structural causes of uterine bleeding

- Polyps: Endometrial polyps are benign growths that are typically detected during gynecologic ultrasonography and confirmed using saline infusion sonography or hysteroscopy, often in combination with an endometrial biopsy providing histopathologic confirmation. Endocervical polyps are visible at the time of a gynecologic examination using a vaginal speculum, and can often be removed with a minor office procedure.
- Adenomyosis: Adenomyosis is a condition in which endometrial glands are present within the muscle of the uterus (myometrium), and the pathogenesis and mechanism by which it causes abnormal bleeding have been debated.
- Leiomyoma (fibroids): Uterine leiomyoma, commonly termed uterine fibroids, are common, and most fibroids are asymptomatic. The presence of leiomyomas may not be the cause of abnormal bleeding, although fibroids that are submucosal in location are the most likely to cause abnormal bleeding.
- Malignancy (pre-cancer and cancer): The Malignancy and Hyperplasia category of the PALM-COEIN system includes malignancies of the genital tract, including cancers of the vulva, the vagina, the cervix, and the uterus. Endometrial hyperplasia, included in this PALM category of abnormal bleeding, is more common in women who are obese or who have a history of chronic anovulation. When endometrial hyperplasia is associated with atypical cells, it can progress to cancer or occur concurrently with it. While endometrial hyperplasia and endometrial cancer occur most commonly among post-menopausal women, most patients with endometrial cancer have abnormal bleeding, and thus the diagnosis must be considered in women during the reproductive years.

COEIN - Non-structural causes of uterine bleeding

- Coagulopathies (blood clotting disorders): Heavy menstrual bleeding can be related to coagulopathies. Von Willebrand disease is the most common coagulopathy, and most women with von Willebrand disease have heavy menstrual bleeding. Of women with heavy menstrual bleeding, up to 20% will have a bleeding disorder. Heavy menstrual bleeding since menarche is a common symptom for women with bleeding disorders, and in retrospective studies, bleeding disorders have been found in up to 62% of adolescents with heavy menstrual bleeding.
- Ovulatory dysfunction: Ovulatory dysfunction or anovulation is a common cause of abnormal bleeding that may lead to irregular and unpredictable bleeding, as well as variations in the amount of flow including heavy bleeding. Endocrine, or hormonal, causes of ovulatory disorders include polyendocrine metabolic ovarian syndrome (PMOS), thyroid disorders, hyperprolactinemia, obesity, eating disorders including anorexia nervosa or bulimia, or to an imbalance between exercise and caloric intake.
- Endometrial: Endometrial causes of abnormal bleeding include infection of the endometrium, endometritis, which may occur after a miscarriage (spontaneous abortion) or a delivery, or may be related to a sexually-transmitted infection of the uterus, fallopian tubes or pelvis generally termed pelvic inflammatory disease (PID). Other endometrial causes of abnormal bleeding may relate to the ways that the endometrium heals itself or develops blood vessels.
- Iatrogenic (caused by medical treatment or procedures): The most common Iatrogenic cause of abnormal bleeding relates to treatment with hormonal medications such as birth control pills, patches, rings, injections, implants, and intrauterine devices (IUDs). Hormone therapy for treatment of menopausal symptoms can also cause abnormal bleeding. Unscheduled bleeding that occurs during such hormonal treatment is termed "breakthrough bleeding" (BTB) Breakthrough bleeding may result from inconsistent use of hormonal treatment, although in the initial months after initiation of a method, it may occur even with perfect use, and may ultimately affect adherence to the medication regimen. The risk of breakthrough bleeding with oral contraceptives is greater if pills are missed.
- Not classified: The Not Classified category of the PALM-COEIN system includes conditions that may be rare, or whose contribution to abnormal bleeding has not been well established or understood.

=== Pregnancy ===
Vaginal bleeding occurs during 15–25% of first trimester pregnancies. Of these, half go on to miscarry and half bring the fetus to term. There are a number of causes including complications to the placenta, such as placental abruption and placenta previa. Other causes include miscarriage, ectopic pregnancy, molar pregnancy, incompetent cervix, uterine rupture, and preterm labor. Bleeding in early pregnancy may be a sign of a threatened or incomplete miscarriage. In the second or third trimester a placenta previa (a placenta partially or completely overlying the cervix) may bleed quite severely. Placental abruption is often associated with uterine bleeding as well as uterine pain.

Vaginal bleeding during pregnancy can be normal, especially in early pregnancy. Light spotting early on in pregnancy can be a result of the fertilized egg implanting into the uterus. Additionally, during pregnancy, the blood supply to the cervix increases, which can cause the cervix to be more friable and bleed more easily than a non-pregnant woman's cervix. Because of this, some light spotting after intercourse can be normal. However, bleeding may also indicate a pregnancy complication that needs to be medically addressed and any vaginal bleeding during pregnancy should prompt a call to the patient's obstetric provider.

=== Perimenopausal ===
While many of the causes of premenopausal bleeding still apply to perimenopausal women, there is an additional cause of abnormal uterine bleeding in this category of women, which is the hormonal changes. Around age 40, women's hormones begin to change and this can cause variation in menstrual patterns. This can last for years, with menstrual periods lasting various lengths and coming at various intervals. Menopause is considered complete after a woman has gone 12 months without a menstrual period.

=== Postmenopausal ===
Endometrial atrophy, uterine fibroids, and endometrial cancer are common causes of postmenopausal vaginal bleeding. About 10% of cases are due to endometrial cancer. Uterine fibroids are benign tumors made of muscle cells and other tissues located in and around the wall of the uterus. Women with fibroids do not always have symptoms, but some experience vaginal bleeding between periods, pain during sex, and lower back pain.

== Diagnostic evaluation ==
The cause of the bleeding can often be discerned on the basis of the bleeding history, physical examination, and other medical tests as appropriate. The physical examination for evaluating vaginal bleeding typically includes visualization of the cervix with a speculum, a bimanual exam, and a rectovaginal exam. These are focused on finding the source of the bleeding and looking for any abnormalities that could cause bleeding. In addition, the abdomen is examined and palpated to ascertain if the bleeding is abdominal in origin. Typically a pregnancy test is performed as well. If bleeding was excessive or prolonged, a CBC may be useful to check for anemia. Abnormal endometrium may have to be investigated by a hysteroscopy with a biopsy or a dilation and curettage.

In 2011, the International Federation of Gynaecology and Obstetrics (FIGO) recognized two systems designed to aid research, education, and clinical care of women with abnormal uterine bleeding (AUB) in the reproductive years.

In postmenopausal vaginal bleeding, the primary goal of any diagnostic evaluations is to exclude endometrial hyperplasia and malignancy. Transvaginal ultrasonography and endometrial sampling are common methods for an initial evaluation. Guidelines from the American College of Obstetricians and Gynecologists (ACOG) recommend transvaginal ultrasonography as an appropriate first-line procedure to identify which patients are at higher risk of endometrial cancer. Endometrial sampling is indicated if having the following findings and/or symptoms:

- Endometrial thickness greater than 4 mm
- Diffuse or focal increased echogenicity (heterogeneity)
- Failure to visualize the endometrium
- Persistent or recurrent bleeding regardless of endometrial thickness

Endometrial sampling can be obtained either by an endometrial biopsy using an endometrium sampling device such as a pipelle or by dilation and curettage (D&C) with or without a hysteroscopy.

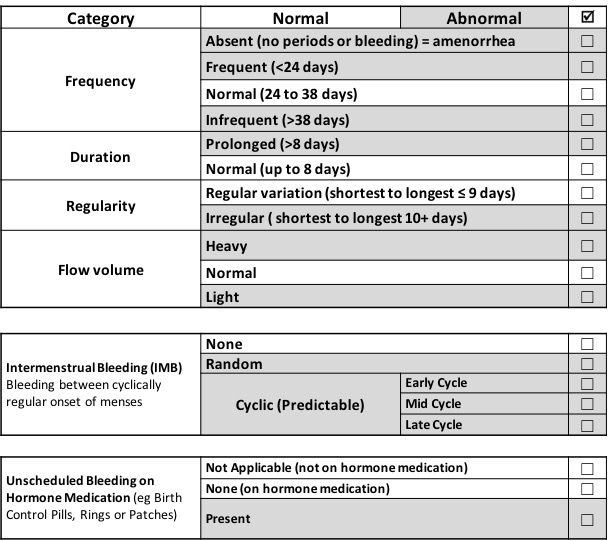
FIGO System 1. The system for definition and nomenclature of normal and abnormal uterine bleeding (AUB) in the reproductive years.

== Complications ==
Severe acute bleeding, such as caused by ectopic pregnancy and post-partum hemorrhage, leads to hypovolemia (the depletion of blood from the circulation), progressing to shock. This is a medical emergency and requires hospital attendance and intravenous fluids, usually followed by blood transfusion. Once the circulating volume has been restored, investigations are performed to identify the source of bleeding and address it. Uncontrolled life-threatening bleeding may require uterine artery embolization (occlusion of the blood vessels supplying the uterus), laparotomy (surgical opening of the abdomen), occasionally leading to hysterectomy (removal of the uterus) as a last resort.

A possible complication from protracted vaginal blood loss is iron deficiency anemia, which can develop insidiously. Eliminating the cause will resolve the anemia, although some women require iron supplements or blood transfusions to improve the anemia.

== Treatment ==
While many forms of vaginal bleeding are normal and do not require treatment, other forms will require medical attention. Hormonal management is usually the first option used to treat acute abnormal uterine bleeding. These hormonal medications include birth control pills, medroxyprogesterone acetate (brand name Depo-Provera), and conjugated equine estrogen. Long-term treatments include hormonal IUD insertion, birth control pills, progestin pills or progestin shots (Depo-Provera), and NSAIDs such as ibuprofen Certain medications may not be safe for certain women. Women with blood clotting disorders may also need to see a hematologist.

Surgical treatments may also be considered if the bleeding is severe or if there are reasons patients cannot take the hormonal medications listed above. These options include dilation & curettage, endometrial ablation, and hysterectomy (removal of the uterus). Hysterectomy will result in infertility, so surgical decisions will include women's preferences regarding future fertility when possible.

== See also ==
- Istihadha
- Abnormal uterine bleeding
- Implantation bleeding
