= Menstrual disorder =

Medical condition affecting menstrual cycle

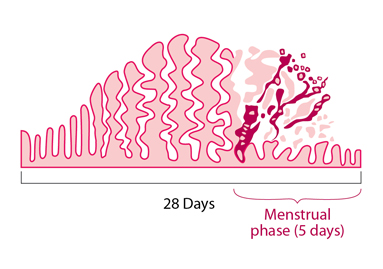
Menstrual Cycle including Menstrual phase (often referred to as "period")

A menstrual disorder is any abnormal condition related to a woman's period. There are many different types of menstrual disorders that vary with signs and symptoms, including pain during menstruation, heavy bleeding, or absence of menstruation. Normal variations can occur in menstrual patterns but generally menstrual disorders can also include periods that come sooner than 21 days apart, more than 3 months apart, or last more than 10 days in duration. Variations of the menstrual cycle are mainly caused by the immaturity of the hypothalamic-pituitary-ovarian (HPO) axis, and early detection and management is required in order to minimize the possibility of complications regarding future reproductive ability.

Though menstrual disorders were once considered more of a nuisance problem, they are now widely recognized as having a serious impact on society in the form of days lost from work brought about by the pain and suffering experienced by women. These disorders can arise from physiologic sources (pregnancy etc.), pathologic sources (stress, excessive exercise, weight loss, endocrine or structural abnormalities etc.), or iatrogenic sources (secondary to contraceptive use etc.).

== Types of menstrual disorders ==
=== Premenstrual disorders ===
- Premenstrual syndrome (PMS) or premenstrual tension refers to the emotional and physical symptoms that routinely occur in the two weeks leading up to menstruation. Symptoms are usually mild, but 5-8% of women experience moderate to severe symptoms that significantly affect daily activities. Symptoms may include anxiety, irritability, mood swings, depression, headache, food cravings, increased appetite, and bloating.
- Premenstrual dysphoric disorder (PMDD) is a severe mood disorder that affects cognitive and physical functions in the week leading up to menstruation. Premenstrual dysphoric disorder is diagnosed with at least one affective, or mood, symptom and at least five physical, mood, and/or behavioral symptoms.

=== Disorders of cycle length ===
Normal menstrual cycle length is 22–45 days.

- Amenorrhea is the absence of a menstrual period in a woman of reproductive age. Physiologic states of amenorrhoea are seen during pregnancy and lactation (breastfeeding). Outside of the reproductive years there is absence of menses during childhood and after menopause.
- Irregular menstruation is where there is variation in menstrual cycle length of more than approximately 8 days for a woman. The term metrorrhagia is often used for irregular menstruation that occurs between the expected menstrual periods.
- Oligomenorrhea is the medical term for infrequent, often light menstrual periods (intervals exceeding 35 days).
- Polymenorrhea is the medical term for cycles with intervals of 21 days or fewer.

=== Disorders of flow ===
Normal menstrual flow length is 3–7 days.

- Abnormal uterine bleeding (AUB) is a broad term used to describe any disruption in bleeding that involves the volume, duration, and/or regularity of flow. Bleeding may occur frequently or infrequently, and can occur between periods, after sexual intercourse, and after menopause. Bleeding during pregnancy is excluded.
- Hypomenorrhea is abnormally light menstrual bleeding.
- Menorrhagia (meno = prolonged, rrhagia = excessive flow/discharge) is an abnormally heavy and prolonged menstrual period.
- Metrorrhagia is bleeding at irregular times, especially outside the expected intervals of the menstrual cycle. If there is excessive menstrual and uterine bleeding other than that caused by menstruation, menometrorrhagia (meno = prolonged, metro = time, rrhagia = excessive flow/discharge) may be diagnosed. Causes may be due to abnormal blood clotting, disruption of normal hormonal regulation of periods or disorders of the endometrial lining of the uterus. Depending upon the cause, it may be associated with abnormally painful periods.

=== Disorders of ovulation ===
Disorders of ovulation include oligoovulation and anovulation:

- Anovulation is absence of ovulation when it would be normally expected (in a post-menarchal, premenopausal woman). Anovulation usually manifests itself as irregularity of menstrual periods, that is, unpredictable variability of intervals, duration, or bleeding. Anovulation can also cause cessation of periods (secondary amenorrhea) or excessive bleeding (dysfunctional uterine bleeding).
- Oligoovulation is infrequent or irregular ovulation (usually defined as cycles of >35 days or <8 cycles a year).

=== Other menstrual disorders ===
- Dysmenorrhea (or dysmenorrhoea), cramps or painful menstruation, involves menstrual periods that are accompanied by either sharp, intermittent pain or dull, aching pain, usually in the pelvis or lower abdomen.

== Signs and symptoms of menstrual disorders ==
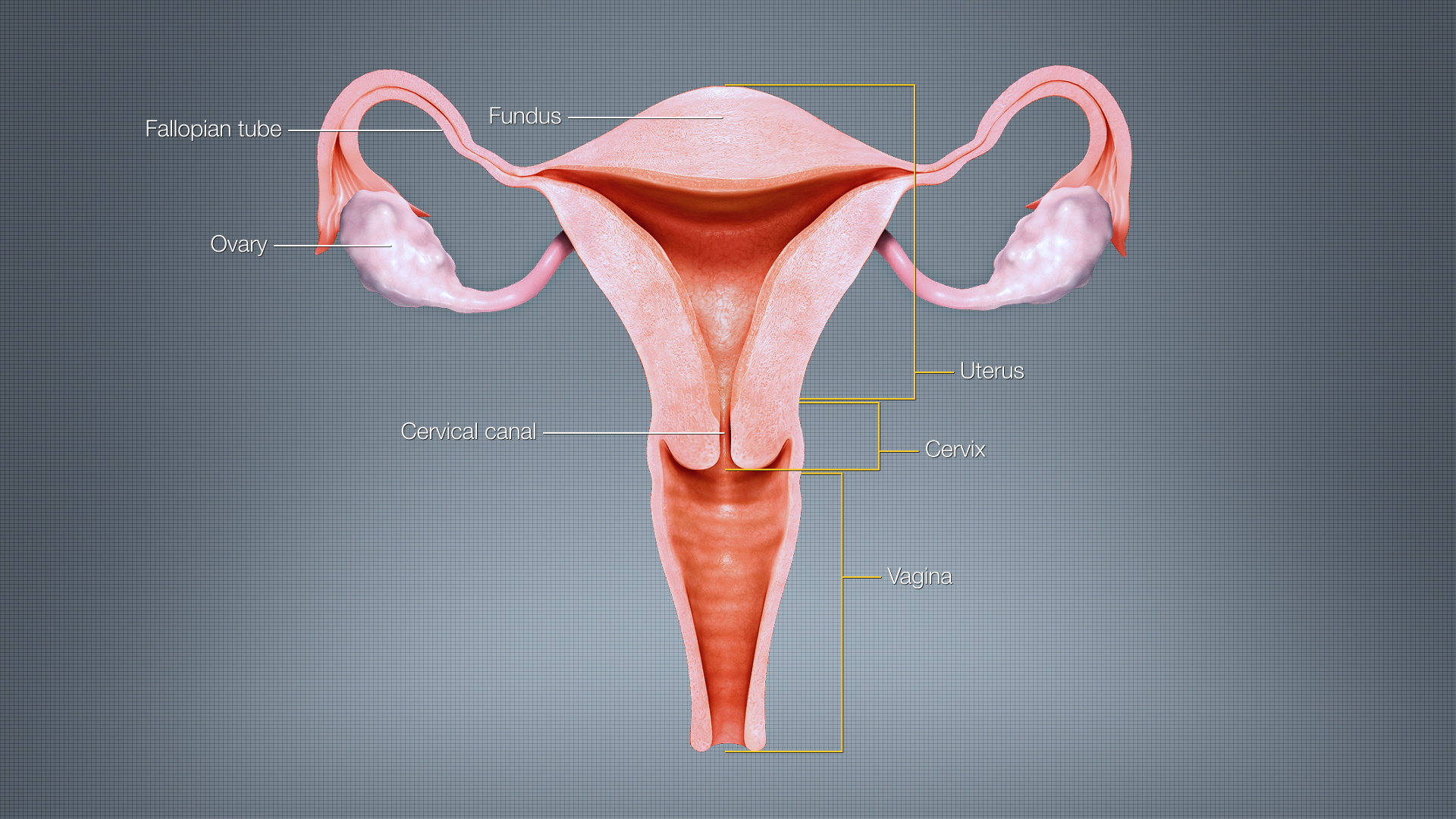
Diagram of a uterus

The signs and symptoms of menstrual disorders can cause significant stress. Abnormal uterine bleeding (AUB) has the potential to be one of the most urgent gynecological problems during menstruation. Dysmenorrhea is the most common.

=== Premenstrual syndrome (PMS) ===
Symptoms may include irritability, bloating, depression, food cravings, aggressiveness, and mood swings. Fluid retention and fluctuating weight gain are also reported.

Precipitating risk factors include: stress, alcohol consumption, exercise, smoking, and some medications.

=== Amenorrhea ===
Lack of a menses by the age of 16 where secondary sexual characteristics have developed or by the age of 14 where no secondary sexual characteristics have developed (primary amenorrhea), or lack of a menses for more than 3–6 months after first menstruation cycle. Although missing a period is the main sign, other symptoms can include: excess facial, hair loss, headache, changes to vision, milky discharge from the breasts, or absence of breast development.

=== Abnormal uterine bleeding ===
One-third of women will experience abnormal uterine bleeding in their life. Normal menstrual cycle has a frequency of 24 to 38 days, lasts 7 to 9 days, so bleeding that lasts longer could be considered abnormal. Very heavy bleeding (for example, needing to use 1 or more tampons or sanitary pads every hour) is another symptom.

=== Dysmenorrhea ===
Especially painful or persistent menstrual cramping that occurs in the absence of any underlying pelvic disease.

Pain radiating to the low back or upper thighs with onset of menstruation and lasting anywhere from 12 to 72 hours. Headache, nausea, vomiting, diarrhea, and fatigue may also accompany the pain. Pain may begin gradually, with the first several years of menses, and then intensified as menstruation becomes regular. Patients who also have secondary amenorrhea report symptoms beginning after age 20 and lasting 5–7 days with progressive worsening of pain over time. Pelvic pain is also reported.

== Causes of menstrual disorders ==
There are many causes of menstrual disorders, including uterine fibroids, hormonal imbalances, clotting disorders, cancer, sexually-transmitted infections, polyendocrine metabolic ovarian syndrome (PMOS), and genetics. Uterine fibroids are benign, non-cancerous growths in the uterus that affect most women at some point in their lives and usually does not require treatment unless they cause intolerable symptoms. Stress and lifestyle factors commonly impact menstruation, which includes weight changes, dieting, changes in exercise, travel, and illness.

Hyperprolactinaemia can also cause menstrual disorders.

=== Amenorrhea ===
There are different causes depending on the type of menstrual (period) disorder. Amenorrhea, or the absence of menstruation, is subdivided into primary and secondary amenorrhea. In primary amenorrhea, in which there is a failure to menstruate by the age of 16 with normal sexual development or by 14 without normal sexual development, causes can be from developmental abnormalities of the uterus, ovaries, or genital tract, or endocrine disorders. In secondary amenorrhea, or the absence of menstruation for greater than 6 months, can be caused by the same reasons as primary amenorrhea, as well as polyendocrine metabolic ovarian syndrome (PMOS), pregnancy, chronic illness, and certain drugs like cocaine and opioids.

=== Hypomenorrhea ===
Causes of hypomenorrhea, or irregular light periods, include periods around menopause, eating disorders, excessive exercise, thyroid dysfunction, uncontrolled diabetes, Cushing's syndrome, hormonal birth control, and certain medications to treat epilepsy or mental health conditions.

=== Menorrhagia ===
Causes of menorrhagia, or heavy menstrual bleeding, include polyendocrine metabolic ovarian syndrome (PMOS), uterine fibroids, endometrial polyps, bleeding disorders, and miscarriage.

=== Menstrual pain ===
Causes of menstrual pain (dysmenorrhea) include endometriosis, pelvic scarring due to chlamydia or gonorrhea, and intrauterine devices or IUDs. Primary dysmenorrhea is when there is no underlying cause that is identified, and secondary dysmenorrhea is when the menstrual pain is caused by other conditions such as endometriosis, fibroids, or infection.

== Diagnosis of menstrual disorders ==
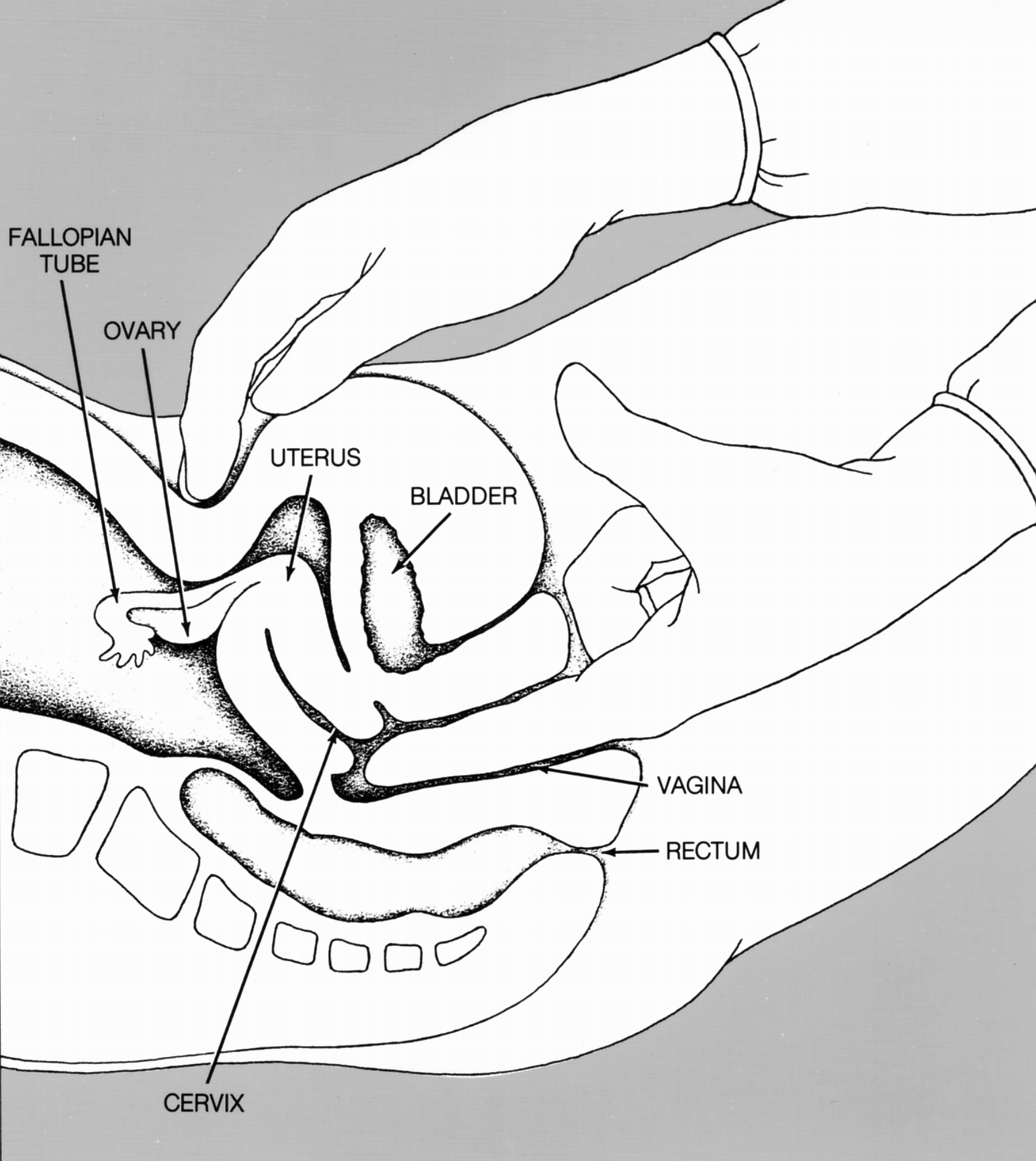
Pelvic exam

Diagnosis begins with an in-depth medical history and physical exam, including a pelvic exam and sometimes a Pap smear.

Additional testing may include but are not limited to blood tests, hormonal tests, ultrasound, gynecologic ultrasound, magnetic resonance imaging (MRI), hysteroscopy, laparoscopy, endometrial biopsy, and dilation and curettage (D&C).

== Treatment of menstrual disorders ==
=== Premenstrual syndrome and premenstrual dysphoric disorder ===
Due to the unclear etiology of premenstrual syndrome and premenstrual dysphoric disorder, symptom relief is the primary goal of treatment. Selective serotonin reuptake inhibitors and spironolactone decrease physical and psychological symptoms associated with premenstrual syndrome. Oral contraceptives may ameliorate physical symptoms of breast tenderness and bloating. Ovarian suppression treatment with gonadotropin-releasing hormone agonist as an off-label use may reduce symptoms but have adverse side effects including decreased bone density. Other less commonly use medications such as alprazolam may reduce anxiety symptoms but has potential for dependence, tolerance, and abuse. Pyridoxine, a form of vitamin B_{6}, may be used as a dietary supplement to relieve overall symptoms.

=== Amenorrhea ===
Successful treatment varies depending on the diagnosis of amenorrhea. In patients with functional hypothalamic amenorrhea due to physical or psychological stress, non-pharmacological options include weight gain, resolution of emotional issues, or decreased intensity of exercise. Patients experiencing amenorrhea due to hypothyroidism may be started with thyroid replacement therapy. Dopamine agonists such as bromocriptine are used in patients with pituitary adenomas. Amenorrhea associated with gonadal dysgenesis or a hypoestrogenic state may be treated with oral contraceptives, patches, or vaginal rings.

Amenorrhea associated with structural anomalies can be addressed with surgical treatment such as gonadectomy.

=== Menorrhagia ===
Acute management of menstrual bleeding includes hormonal therapy with estrogen or oral contraceptives until bleeding has stopped followed by an oral contraceptive tapering regimen. Adjunctive therapy may include iron supplements and nonsteroidal anti-inflammatory drugs. Patients who do not respond to hormonal therapy may use antifibrinolytics. Procedural therapy such as a suction curettage and intrauterine balloon tamponade are reserved for patients who do not respond to medication therapy and do not put fertility at risk. Life-threatening situations may consider more invasive procedures such as endometrial ablation, uterine artery embolization, and hysterectomy.

Long-term management include estrogen-containing therapy and progestin therapy.

=== Dysmenorrhea ===
Primary dysmenorrhea is commonly treated with nonsteroidal anti-inflammatory drugs such as ibuprofen to reduce moderate to severe pain. Other simple analgesics such as aspirin or acetaminophen are less commonly used but may also reduce short-term pain. Supplements including thiamine and vitamin E may reduce pain in younger women. Non-pharmacological interventions such as the use of external heat are also effective at reducing pain. Regular exercises can also reduce pain.

== See also ==
- Premenstrual syndrome (PMS)
- Pelvic inflammatory disease
- Adenomyosis
- Fibroids
- Ovarian cysts
- Endometriosis
