= Metropathia haemorrhagica =

Frequent and heavy menstruation

- Other names: Metropathia haemorrhagica; Metropathia hemorrhagica; Metropathica haemorrhagica; Metropathica hemorrhagica; Metropathia haemorrhagica cystica; Metropathia hemorrhagica cystica
- Specialty: Gynecology

Metropathia haemorrhagica, also known as metropathia haemorrhagica cystica, is a menstrual disorder which is defined as a specialized type of anovulatory dysfunctional uterine bleeding associated with endometrial hyperplasia and intermenstrual bleeding. The condition was defined by 1930. It has been agreed that the term "metropathia haemorrhagica" should be discarded along with many other older terms for menstrual disorders. Due to diffuse polyposis

typical presentation is that of a female (40-45 yrs)

With a history of Amenorrhea for 2 weeks

Followed by excessive menstrual bleeding cause being anovulation

Histopathology:

Proliferative endometrium without atypical changes

Swiss cheese appearance

On USG increased endometrial thickness without atypical change
