= Etonogestrel implant =

Implantable birth control device

Etonogestrel subcutaneous implant
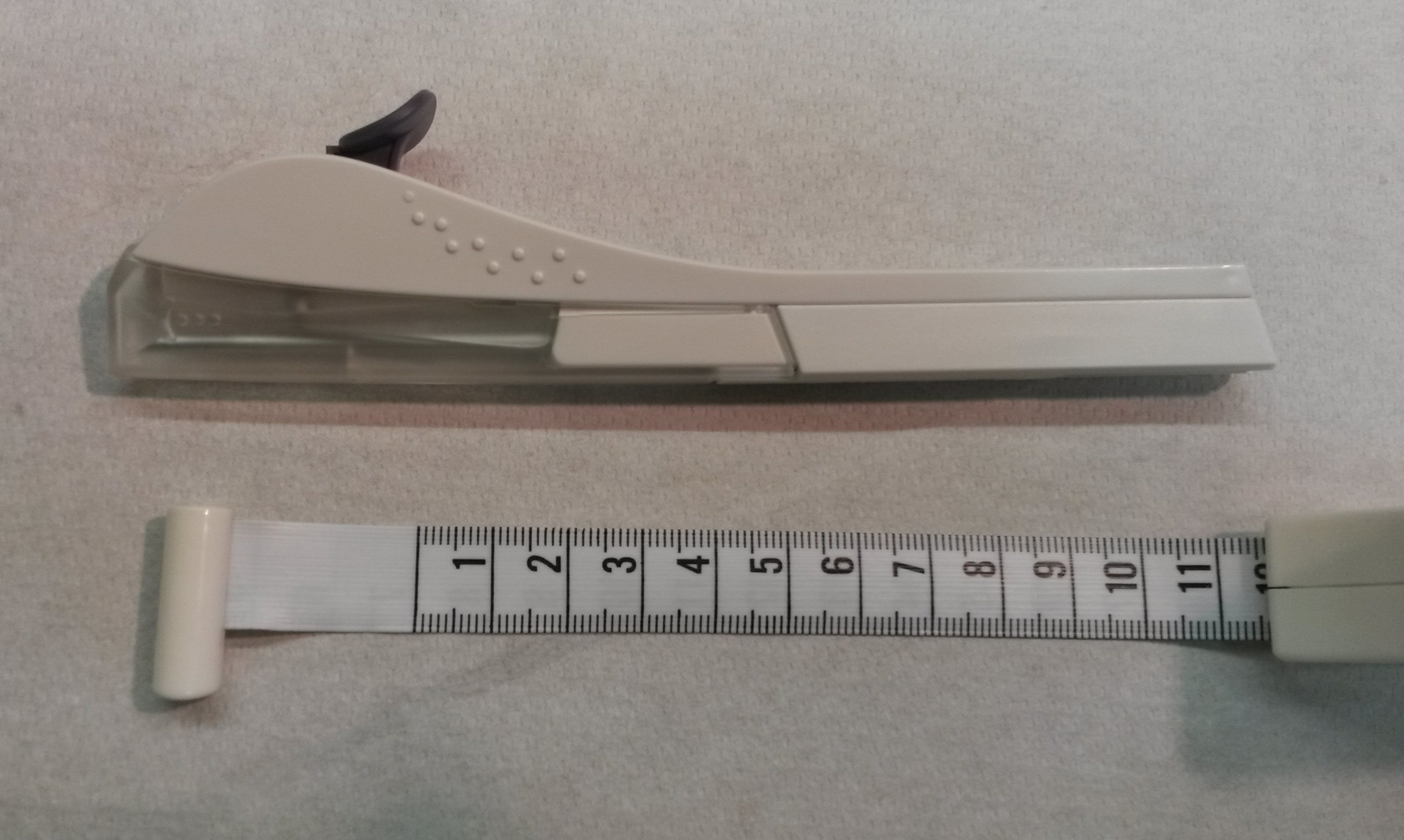

Background
- Type: ?
- First use: ?
- Trade names: Nexplanon

Pregnancy rates (first year)
- Perfect use: ?
- Typical use: ?

Usage
- Duration effect: Up to 5 years (US)
- Reversibility: Immediately reversible
- User reminders: ?

Advantages and disadvantages
- STI protection: No

The etonogestrel implant, also called the contraceptive implant, or known by trade names Nexplanon or Implanon is one type of progestin-releasing birth control device implanted under the skin.

In the United States, Nexplanon is approved for up to five years of contraceptive use following a January 2026 FDA label extension.

== Medical uses ==
In the United States, Nexplanon is used to prevent pregnancy for up to five years. It is not typically used to control heavy or abnormal menstrual bleeding. It is safe and effective in people who have previously been pregnant, are breastfeeding, or have never been pregnant. There is no known decrease in efficacy in people with overweight or obesity.

== Contraindications ==
There are very few relative or absolute contraindications to the etonogestrel implant. Active hepatocellular carcinoma and a history of breast cancer more than 5 years prior to insertion are listed as relative contraindications. Active breast cancer is listed as an absolute contraindication.

== Side effects ==
Rarely, the device may migrate out of its typical location under the skin of the upper arm. As of June 2024, 148 cases of migration were reported in the medical literature, including to the pulmonary vessels, other blood vessels, and outside of the blood vessels.
