= Polymenorrhagia =

Frequent and heavy menstruation

- Other names: Frequent and heavy periods; Frequent and heavy menstrual bleeding; Frequent and heavy menstruation; Excessive and frequent menstruation; Epimenorrhagia; Polyhypermenorrhea; Polyhypermenorrhoea; Polyhypermenorrhœa; Hyperpolymenorrhea
- Specialty: Gynecology

Polymenorrhagia, also known as frequent and heavy periods or frequent and heavy menstrual bleeding as well as epimenorrhagia or polyhypermenorrhea, is a menstrual disorder which refers to a combination of polymenorrhea (frequent menstrual bleeding) and menorrhagia (heavy menstrual bleeding).

== Causes ==
Polymenorrhagia can result from a variety of underlying medical conditions. Common causes include hormonal imbalances, particularly related to estrogen and progesterone levels, as well as thyroid disorders and ovulatory dysfunction. Other contributing factors may include uterine abnormalities, such as fibroids, endometrial polyps, and adenomyosis.

== Diagnosis ==
Diagnosis of polymenorrhagia typically involves a detailed menstrual history, blood work to evaluate hormone levels and thyroid function, and imaging techniques like ultrasound to assess the uterus for abnormalities. In some cases, endometrial biopsy may be necessary to rule out hyperplasia or malignancy.

== Treatment ==
Treatment for polymenorrhagia depends on the underlying cause and the severity of symptoms. Hormonal therapies such as oral contraceptives or progesterone can help regulate the menstrual cycle. In more severe cases, surgical options like endometrial ablation or hysterectomy may be considered.
