= Benign gynecological condition =

- Specialty: Gynaecology

A benign gynecological condition is a non-cancerous (benign) issue affecting the female reproductive system, including common conditions such as uterine fibroids and endometriosis.

== Signs and symptoms ==
The main symptoms of benign gynecological conditions are heavy menstrual bleeding, pelvic pain, and a dragging, heavy pelvic sensation, or lump in vagina.

== Causes ==
Benign gynecological conditions include fecal incontinence, urinary incontinence, uterine and/or vaginal wall prolapse, interstitial cystitis, irritable bowel syndrome, diverticulitis, benign ovarian masses, uterine fibroids, endometriosis, ectopic pregnancy, pelvic inflammatory disease, adenomyosis, endometrial polyps, and endometrial molecular pathway disturbances.
