= Cervical polyp =

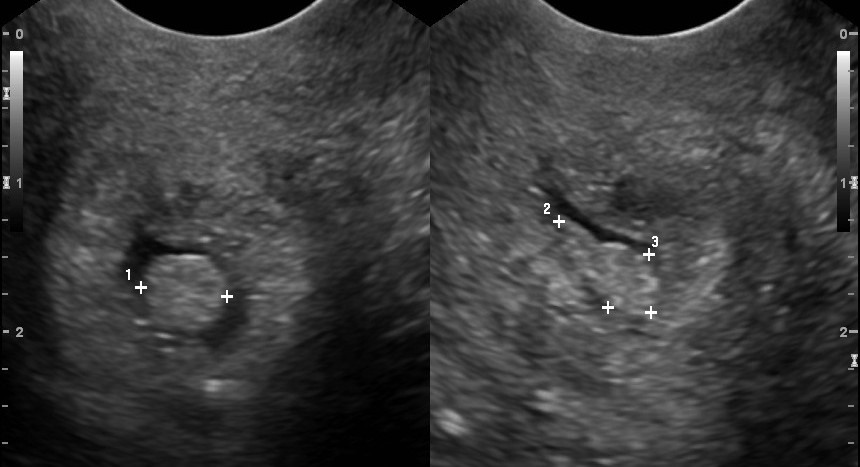
- Cervical polyp on ultrasound
- Specialty: Gynecology

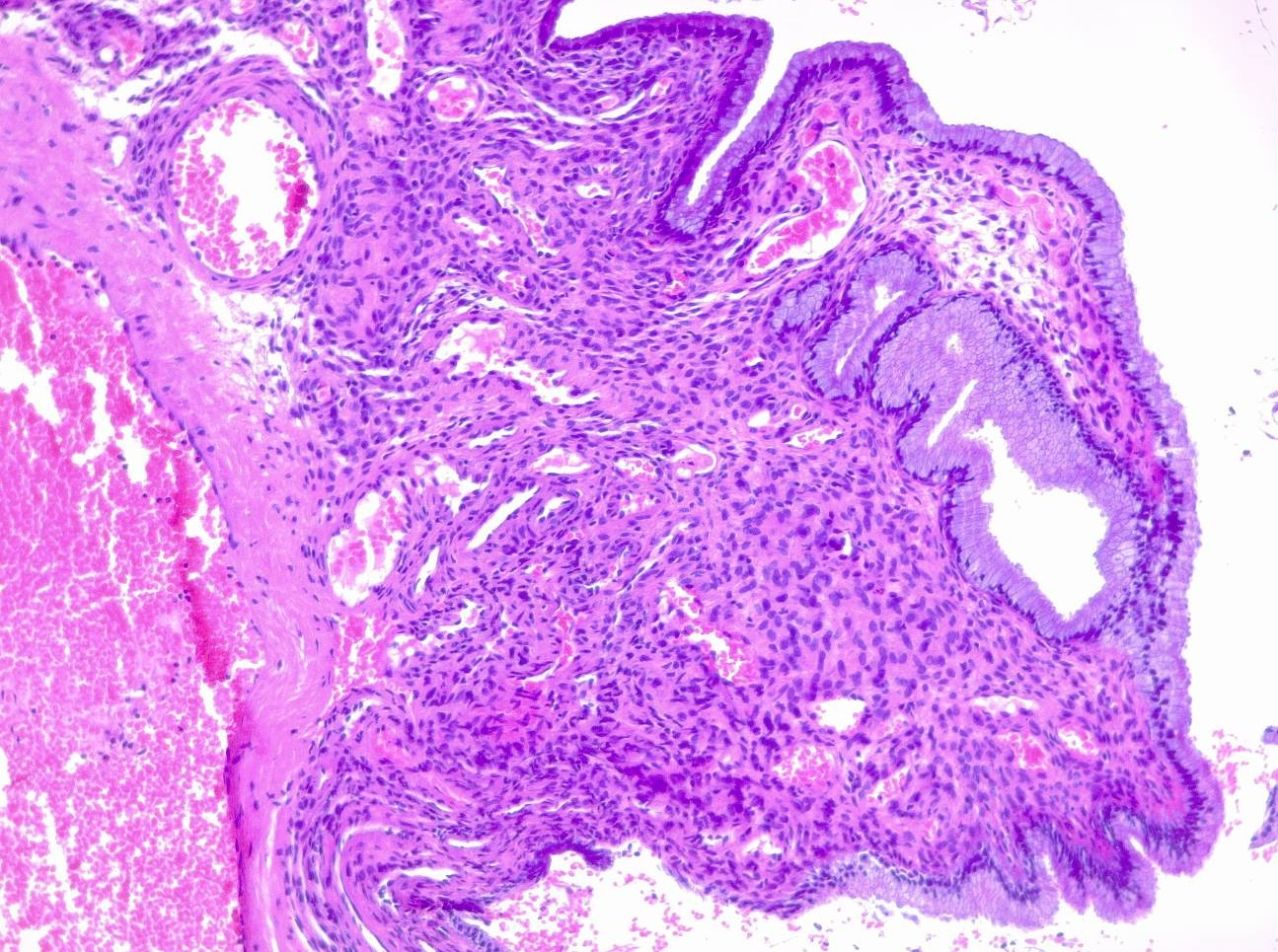
Histopathology of endocervical polyp: With endocervical epithelium and glands (mucinous columnar linings), edematous stroma and clear congestion. H&E stain.

A cervical polyp is a common benign polyp or tumour on the surface of the cervical canal. They can cause irregular menstrual bleeding but often show no symptoms. Treatment consists of simple removal of the polyp and prognosis is generally good. About 1% of cervical polyps will show neoplastic change which may lead to cancer. They are most common in post-menarche, pre-menopausal women who have been pregnant.

== Signs and symptoms ==
Cervical polyps often show no symptoms. Where there are symptoms, they include intermenstrual bleeding, abnormally heavy menstrual bleeding (menorrhagia), vaginal bleeding in post-menopausal women, bleeding after sex and thick white vaginal or yellowish discharge (leukorrhoea).

== Cause ==
The cause of cervical polyps is uncertain, but they are often associated with inflammation of the cervix. They may also occur as a result of raised levels of estrogen or clogged cervical blood vessels.

== Diagnosis ==
Cervical polyps can be seen during a pelvic examination as red or purple projections from the cervical canal. Diagnosis can be confirmed by a cervical biopsy which will reveal the nature of the cells present.

=== Structure ===
Cervical polyps are finger-like growths, generally less than 1 cm in diameter. They are generally bright red in colour, with a spongy texture. They may be attached to the cervix by a stalk (pedunculated) and occasionally prolapse into the vagina where they can be mistaken for endometrial polyps or submucosal fibroids.

== Treatment ==
Cervical polyps can be removed using ring forceps. They can also be removed by tying surgical string around the polyp and cutting it off. The remaining base of the polyp can then be removed using a laser or by cauterisation. If the polyp is infected, an antibiotic may be prescribed.

== Prognosis ==
99% of cervical polyps will remain benign and 1% will at some point show neoplastic change. Cervical polyps are unlikely to regrow.

== Epidemiology ==
Cervical polyps are most common in women who have had children and perimenopausal women. They are rare in pre-menstrual girls and uncommon in post-menopausal women.

== See also ==
- Endometrial polyp
