= Neonatal uterine bleeding =

Uterine bleeding that occurs in newborns

Neonatal uterine bleeding (NUB) also known as neonatal menstrual-like bleeding, neonatal menstruation and false menses is vaginal bleeding that occurs in some female neonates shortly after birth as a result of withdrawal from maternal hormones. Overt neonatal uterine bleeding can be seen in neonates with the prevalence of 3–10%, but bleeding that is not visible (called occult neonatal uterine bleeding) can also be revealed by laboratory tests, with the incidence of 25–60% in the reported literature. Neonatal uterine bleeding is thought to be a normal physiological reaction that does not need any treatment.

Neonatal uterine bleeding usually occurs in the first 10 days after birth. Laboratory evaluation is performed if bleeding is prolonged or excessive. Vaginal bleeding that happens in the later periods after birth is not neonatal uterine bleeding, and it is considered pathological; the differential diagnosis in such cases assumes many different possible causes, including infections.

Neonatal uterine bleeding has probably been seen by mothers from ancient times, but practitioners of those times did not notice it, possibly because there were not any other accompanying symptoms, considering it clinically insignificant. As a distinct type of vaginal bleeding, it was acknowledged only in the 19th century. In the 20th century, the cause of neonatal uterine bleeding was revealed, and it was considered a normal physiological reaction.

== Characteristics ==
Neonatal uterine bleeding occurs shortly after birth, between 3 and 5 days of infancy. Female infants may experience bleeding for up to 10 days.

It is caused by an exposure of the fetus to the mother's high level hormones like estrogen and progesterone. After birth the abrupt decrease and withdrawal of these hormones leads to a drop in the baby's hormone levels which affect the developing fetal endometrium, triggering the shedding of the uterus which can cause small vaginal bleeding. However, it is theorized that a mucus plug in the neonate's cervix can contribute to a "retrograde flux" of endometrial cells into the pelvic cavity, which may contribute to NUB.

== Occurrence ==
Neonatal uterine bleeding varies considerably. In a study carried out by Judith Dekker, "the prevalence of visible bleeding ranged from 3.3 to 53.8% and the prevalence of occult bleeding from 25.4 to 96.7%". NUB occurrence is highest between the 3rd and 7th day of postpartum.

According to studies, NUB occurs in approximately 5% of female newborns. While it is rare, biochemical proofs of vaginal bleeding can be found in 25–61% of neonates.

== Effects ==
Studies suggest that the presence of endometrial mesenchymal stem cells (eMSCs) in neonatal uterine blood could lead to early development of endometriosis hypothesizing a link between NUB and accelerated maturation of endometriosis. The retrograde flow of endometrial cells during NUB may lead to ectopic endometrial implants in the pelvic cavity that can become active later in life, especially after menarche begins.

== See also ==
- Abnormal uterine bleeding
