= Polymenorrhea =

More frequent menstruation

- Other names: Polymenorrhoea; Polymenorrhœa; Frequent periods; Frequent menstrual bleeding; Frequent menstruation; Epimenorrhea; Epimenorrhoea; Epimenorrhœa; Abnormally frequent menstruation; Unusually frequent menses
- Specialty: Gynecology
- Symptoms: Short menstrual cycles (<21 days) that are otherwise regular and normal
- Complications: Anemia; Iron deficiency; Endometrial cancer (when related to inadequate luteal phase)
- Causes: Anovulation; Inadequate/short luteal phase; Short follicular phase; Certain endocrine disorders; Puberty/adolescence; Perimenopause
- Differential diagnosis: Metrorrhagia (intermenstrual bleeding)
- Treatment: Hormonal agents
- Medication: Progestogen during luteal phase; Combined oral contraceptive pill
- Prognosis: Usually transient and self-limited

Polymenorrhea, also known as frequent periods, frequent menstruation, or frequent menstrual bleeding, is a menstrual disorder in which menstrual cycles are shorter than 21 days in length and hence where menstruation occurs more frequently than usual. Cycles are regular and menstrual flow is normal in the condition. Normally, menstrual cycles are 25 to 30 days in length, with a median duration of 28 days.

Polymenorrhea is usually caused by anovulation (failure to ovulate), an inadequate or short luteal phase, and/or a short follicular phase. Polymenorrhea is common in puberty and adolescence due to the immaturity of the hypothalamic–pituitary–gonadal axis (HPG axis). Shorter menstrual cycles are also common in the early perimenopause (menopausal transition), during which time the lengths of menstrual cycles may be reduced by 3 to 7 days secondary to a shorter follicular phase. Certain endocrine disorders, such as hyperprolactinemia, hypothyroidism, hyperthyroidism, Cushing's syndrome, and acromegaly, can cause polymenorrhea. While not a classical symptom, polymenorrhea can occur as a result of uterine fibroids. Polymenorrhea may result in anemia and iron deficiency due to blood loss. In addition, when it is due to an inadequate luteal phase and hence progesterone deficiency, polymenorrhea may be related to an increased risk of endometrial cancer.

Polymenorrhea is usually transient and self-limited, thereby not necessitating treatment. If it persists, is disturbing, or if there is considerable blood loss due to the frequent periods, treatment may be indicated. The mainstays of treatment are a progestogen during the luteal phase of the cycle or a combined oral contraceptive pill.

Polymenorrhea is sometimes confused with metrorrhagia (menstrual bleeding between periods). It can be distinguished from metrorrhagia by its regularity. Polymenorrhea can be contrasted with oligomenorrhea, in which menstrual cycles are greater than 35 or 37 days in length. The condition can also be distinguished from polymenorrhagia, which is a combination of polymenorrhea and menorrhagia (heavy menstrual bleeding).
