= Hypomenorrhea =

Extremely light menstrual blood flow

Hypomenorrhea or hypomenorrhoea, also known as short or scanty periods, refers to extremely light menstrual blood flow. It is the opposite of heavy periods or hypermenorrhea which is more accurately termed menorrhagia.

== Overview ==
In some individuals it may be normal to have less bleeding during menstrual periods. Less blood flow may be genetic and, if enquiries are made, it may be found that an individual’s mother and/or sister also have decreased blood flow during their periods. Pregnancy can normally occur with this type of decreased flow during the period. The incidence of infertility is the same as in individuals with a normal blood flow. Constitutional scanty menstruation is perhaps best explained by assuming the presence of an unusual arrangement, or relative insensitivity, of the endometrial vascular apparatus.

Reduced menstrual flow is a common side-effect of hormonal contraception methods, such as oral contraceptive pills, IUDs that release hormones (such as Mirena), or hormonal implants such as Depo-Provera. The relatively low estrogen contained in most hormonal contraceptives reduces the growth of the endometrium, so there is relatively little endometrium left to be shed during menstruation. Many individuals find this side-effect to be a benefit of hormonal contraceptive use.

Scanty menses or periods can occur normally at the extremes of the reproductive life that is, just after puberty and just before menopause. This is because ovulation is irregular at this time, and the endometrial lining fails to develop normally. But normal problems at other times can also cause scanty blood flow. An ovulation due to a low thyroid hormone level, high prolactin level, high insulin level, high androgen level and problems with other hormones can also cause scanty periods.

Despite these common causes, hypomenorrhea is still technically an abnormality of the menstrual flow, and other underlying medical problems should be ruled out by a doctor.

== Disorders causing scanty menstruation ==
- One cause of hypomenorrhea is Asherman's syndrome (intrauterine adhesions), of which hypomenorrhea (or amenorrhea) may be the only apparent sign. The degree of menstrual deficiency is closely correlated to the extent of the adhesions.
- Uterine: Scanty loss sometimes means that the bleeding surface is smaller than normal, and is occasionally seen when the endometrial cavity has been reduced in size during myomectomy or other plastic operation on the uterus. However, it rarely indicates uterine hypoplasia because the presence of this condition in a uterus which is responsive to hormones indicates ovarian under-activity, and this manifests itself by infrequent (oligomenorrhea) rather than scanty menstruation.
- Nervous and emotional: Psychogenic factors such as stress or excessive excitement may cause hypomenorrhea. Such factors suppress the activity of the centers in the brain that stimulate the ovaries during the ovarian cycle (to secrete hormones such as estrogen and progesterone), and may result in low production of these hormones.
- Low body fat: Excessive exercise and crash dieting can cause scanty menstrual periods when the proportion of body fat drops beneath a certain level. This may cause a total absence of periods (also called amenorrhea).

== Diagnosis ==
Blood tests for the level of hormones such as follicle-stimulating hormone, luteinizing hormone, estrogen, prolactin, insulin may be conducted. In polyendocrine metabolic ovarian syndrome (PMOS), there will be high levels of insulin and androgens. An ultrasonogram can diagnose the thickness of the endometrium, size of the ovaries, growth of follicles, ovulation and other abnormalities. Tests such as dilation and curettage and MRI scans are sometimes needed to determine the cause of scanty blood flow during the periods.

== Treatment ==
Unless a significant causal abnormality is found, no treatment other than reassurance is necessary. Otherwise, treatment is determined by the diagnosis of any significant causal abnormality.

== See also ==
- Metrorrhagia
