= Menometrorrhagia =

- Specialty: Gynecology

Menometrorrhagia, also known as heavy irregular menstrual bleeding, is a condition in which prolonged or excessive uterine bleeding occurs irregularly and more frequently than normal. It is thus a combination of metrorrhagia (intermenstrual bleeding) and menorrhagia (heavy/prolonged menstrual bleeding).

== Causes ==
It can occur due to any of several causes, including hormonal imbalance, endometriosis, uterine fibroids, usage of progestin-only contraception, or cancer. Not least, it can be caused by deficiencies of several clotting factors. It can lead to anemia in long-standing cases.

== Diagnosis ==
The initial workup includes exclusion of pregnancy and cancer, by performing a pregnancy test, a pelvic exam and a gynecologic ultrasound. Further workup depends on outcomes of the preceding tests and may include hydrosonography, hysteroscopy, endometrial biopsy, and magnetic resonance imaging.

== Treatment ==
Treatment depends on the cause. In cases where malignancy is ruled out, hormone supplementation or the therapeutic use of hormonal contraception is usually recommended to induce bleeding on a regular schedule. Selective progesterone receptor modulators (SPRMs) are sometimes used to stop uterine bleeding.

== Epidemiology ==
It occurs in up to 24% of women ages 40-55 years.

== See also ==
- Von Willebrand disease
- List of hematologic conditions
