= Endometrial polyp =

Mass on the interior lining of the uterus

- Other names: Uterine polyp
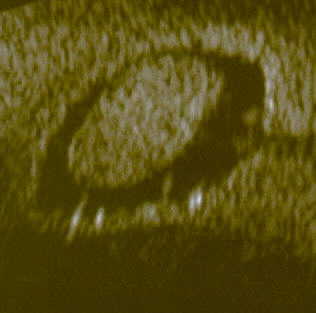
- Endometrial polyp, viewed by sonography
- Specialty: Gynecology

An endometrial polyp or uterine polyp is a mass in the inner lining of the uterus. They may have a large flat base (sessile) or be attached to the uterus by an elongated pedicle (pedunculated). Pedunculated polyps are more common than sessile ones. They range in size from a few millimeters to several centimeters. If pedunculated, they can protrude through the cervix into the vagina. Small blood vessels may be present, particularly in large polyps.

== Signs and symptoms ==
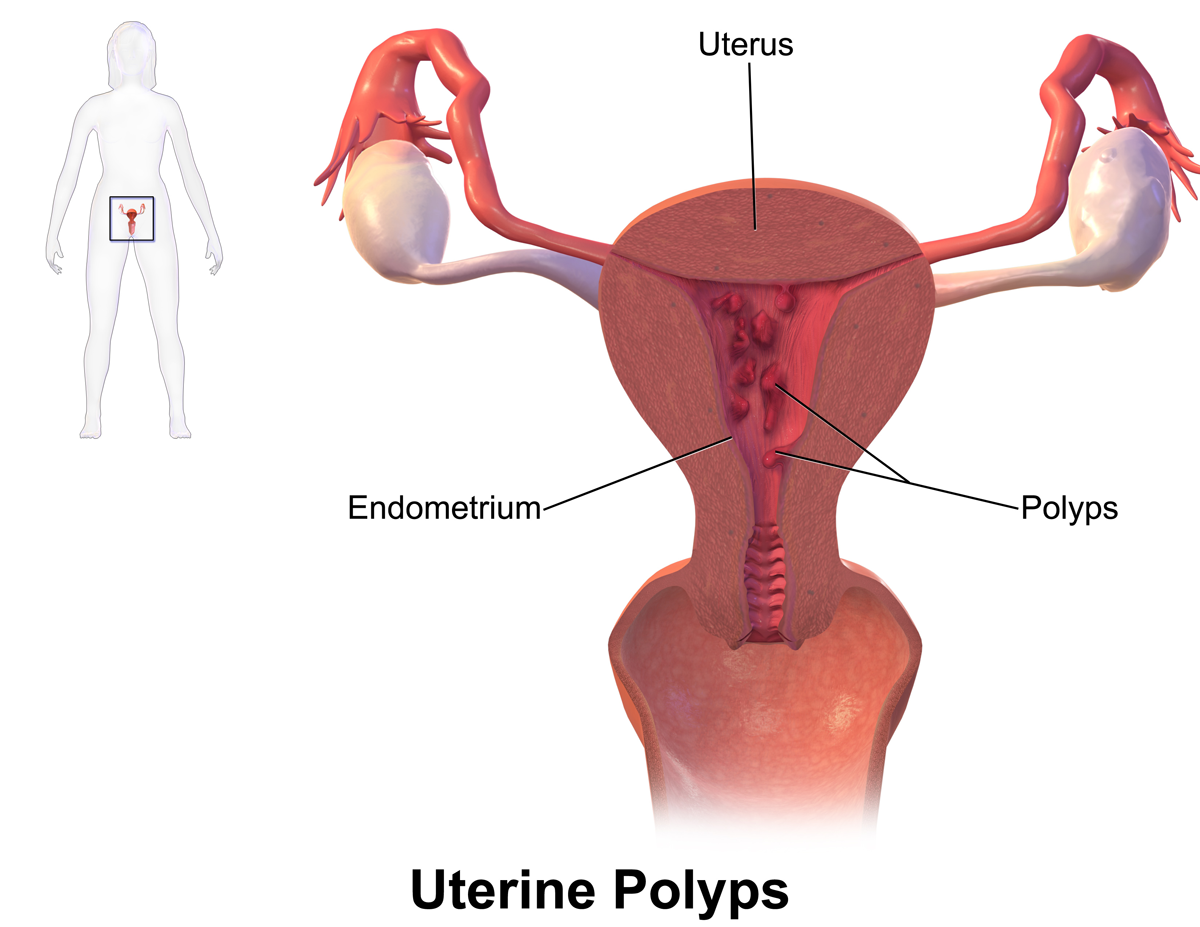
Uterine polyps

They often cause no symptoms. Where they occur, symptoms include irregular menstrual bleeding, bleeding between menstrual periods, excessively heavy menstrual bleeding (menorrhagia), and vaginal bleeding after menopause. Bleeding from the blood vessels of the polyp contributes to an increase of blood loss during menstruation and blood "spotting" between menstrual periods, or after menopause. If the polyp protrudes through the cervix into the vagina, pain (dysmenorrhea) may result.

== Cause ==
No definitive cause of endometrial polyps is known, but they appear to be affected by hormone levels and grow in response to circulating estrogen. Risk factors include obesity, high blood pressure and a history of cervical polyps. Taking tamoxifen or hormone replacement therapy can also increase the risk of uterine polyps. The use of an intrauterine system containing levonorgestrel in women taking tamoxifen may reduce the incidence of polyps.

== Diagnosis ==
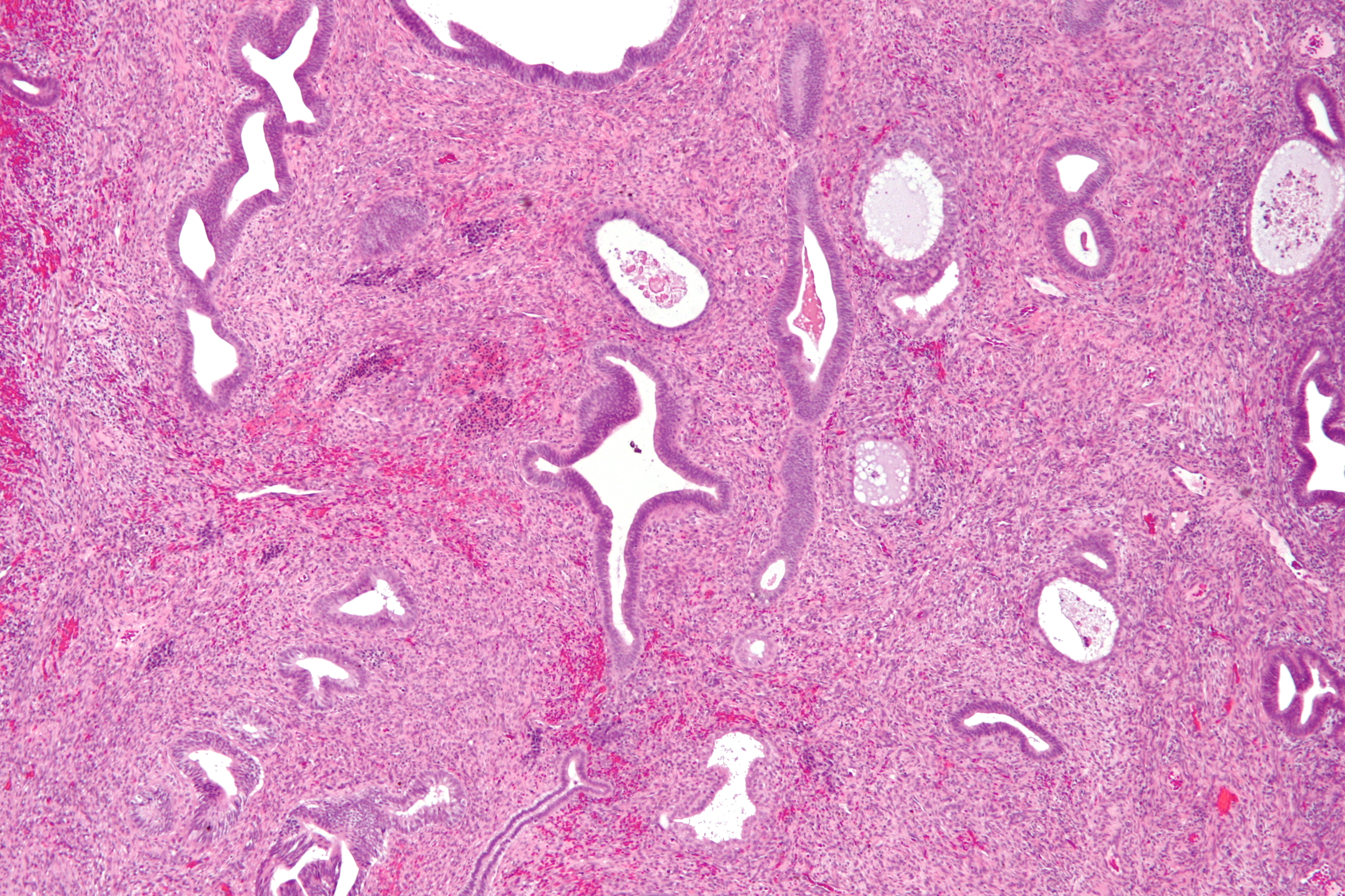
Micrograph of an endometrial polyp. H&E stain.

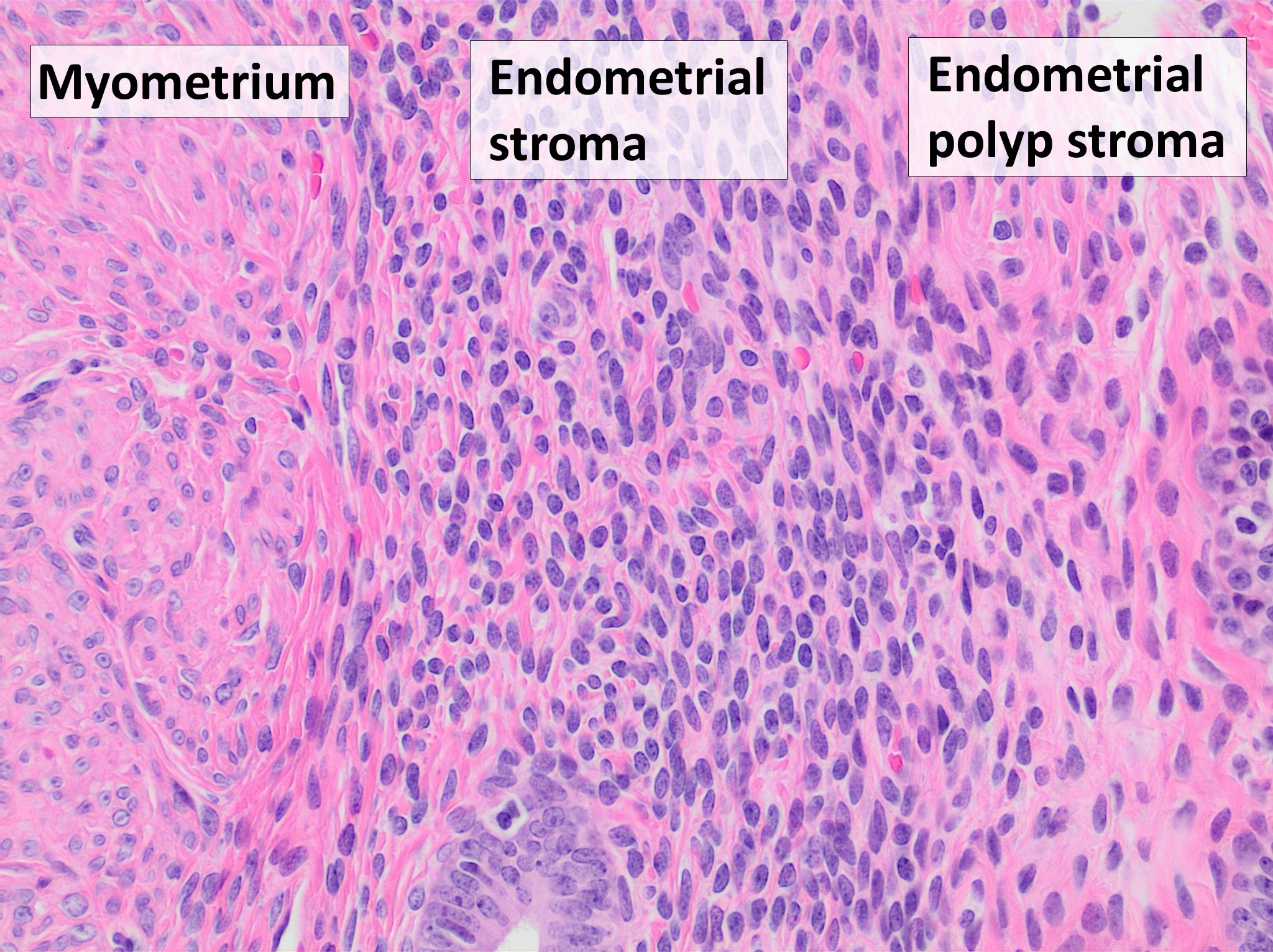
Myometrium (smooth muscle cells) versus endometrial stroma (more cellular) versus endometrial polyp stroma (more collagenous). H&E stain

Endometrial polyps can be detected by vaginal ultrasound (sonohysterography), hysteroscopy and dilation and curettage. Detection by ultrasonography can be difficult, particularly when there is endometrial hyperplasia (excessive thickening of the endometrium). Larger polyps may be missed by curettage.

Endometrial polyps can be solitary or occur with others. They are round or oval and measure between a few millimeters and several centimeters in diameter. They are usually the same red/brown color of the surrounding endometrium although large ones can appear to be a darker red. The polyps consist of dense, fibrous tissue (stroma), blood vessels and glandlike spaces lined with endometrial epithelium. If they are pedunculated, they are attached by a thin stalk (pedicle). If they are sessile, they are connected by a flat base to the uterine wall. Pedunculated polyps are more common than sessile ones.

== Treatment ==
Polyps can be surgically removed using curettage with or without hysteroscopy. When curettage is performed without hysteroscopy, polyps may be missed. To reduce this risk, the uterus can be first explored using grasping forceps at the beginning of the curettage procedure. Hysteroscopy involves visualising the endometrium (inner lining of the uterus) and polyp with a camera inserted through the cervix. Large polyps can be cut into sections before each section is removed. The presence of cancerous cells may suggest a hysterectomy (surgical removal of the uterus). A hysterectomy is usually not considered when cancer is not present. In either procedure, general anesthetic is typically supplied.

The effects of polyp removal on fertility has not been studied.

== Prognosis ==
Endometrial polyps are usually benign although some may be precancerous or cancerous. About 0.5% of endometrial polyps contain adenocarcinoma cells. Polyps can increase the risk of miscarriage in women undergoing IVF treatment. If they develop near the fallopian tubes, they may lead to difficulty in becoming pregnant. Although treatments such as hysteroscopy usually cure the polyp concerned, recurrence of endometrial polyps is frequent. Untreated, small polyps may regress on their own.

== Epidemiology ==
Endometrial polyps usually occur in women in their 40s and 50s. Endometrial polyps occur in up to 10% of women. It is estimated that they are present in 25% of women with abnormal vaginal bleeding.

== See also ==
- Cervical polyp
- Uterine fibroids
