= Abnormal uterine bleeding =

Frequent, irregular, excessive, or heavy vaginal bleeding from the uterus

- Other names: Atypical vaginal bleeding, dysfunctional uterine bleeding (DUB), abnormal vaginal bleeding
- Specialty: Gynecology
- Symptoms: Irregular, abnormally frequent, prolonged, or excessive amounts of uterine bleeding
- Complications: Iron deficiency anemia
- Causes: Ovulation problems, fibroids, lining of the uterus growing into the uterine wall, uterine polyps, underlying bleeding problems, side effects from birth control, cancer
- Diagnostic method: Based on symptoms, blood work, medical imaging, hysteroscopy
- Differential diagnosis: Ectopic pregnancy
- Treatment: Hormonal birth control, GnRH agonists, tranexamic acid, NSAIDs, surgery
- Frequency: Relatively common

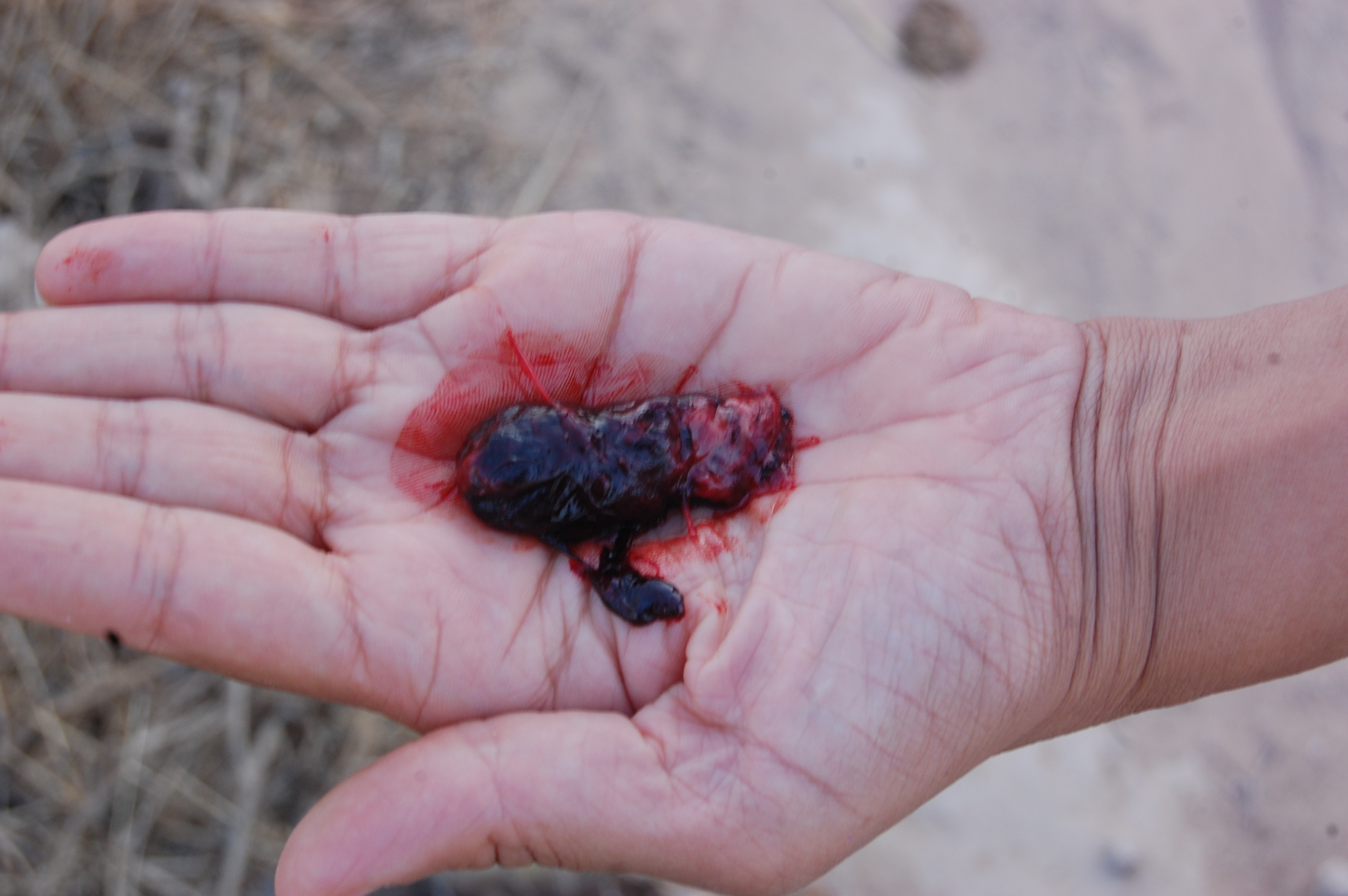
Blood clot from uterus wounded by an intrauterine device. Any blood clot larger than a centimeter (about half an inch) is considered abnormal and potentially dangerous.

Abnormal uterine bleeding is vaginal bleeding from the uterus that is abnormally frequent, lasts excessively long, is heavier than normal, or is irregular. The term "dysfunctional uterine bleeding" was used when no underlying cause was present. Quality of life may be negatively affected.

The underlying causes may be structural or non-structural and are classified in accordance with the FIGO system 1 & 2. Common causes include: Ovulation problems, fibroids, the lining of the uterus growing into the uterine wall, uterine polyps, underlying bleeding problems, side effects from birth control, or cancer. Susceptibility to each cause is often dependent on an individual's stage in life (prepubescent, premenopausal, postmenopausal). More than one category of causes may apply in an individual case. The first step in work-up is to rule out a tumor or pregnancy. Vaginal bleeding during pregnancy may be abnormal in certain circumstances. Please see Obstetrical bleeding and early pregnancy bleeding for more information. Medical imaging or hysteroscopy may help with the diagnosis.

Treatment depends on the underlying cause. Options may include hormonal birth control, gonadotropin-releasing hormone agonists, tranexamic acid, nonsteroidal anti-inflammatory drugs, and surgery such as endometrial ablation or hysterectomy. Over the course of a year, roughly 20% of reproductive-aged women self-report at least one symptom of abnormal uterine bleeding.

== Signs and symptoms ==
Although uterine bleeding can be alarming and abnormal, there are many instances in which uterine bleeding is normal. FIGO System 1 is the first part of the classification system developed by the International Federation of Gynecology and Obstetrics to standardize the differences between normal uterine bleeding and abnormal uterine bleeding based on frequency, duration, regularity and individual flow volume.

=== Normal uterine bleeding ===
- Monthly Menstrual cycle occurring every 21 – 35 days. (Most common cause of uterine bleeding).
- Neonatal uterine bleeding can occur in newborn females due to rapidly decreasing estrogen levels.
- Postpartum lochia is a bloody discharge that occurs post pregnancy and can last for several weeks.
- Uterine procedures such as biopsies, myomectomies, intrauterine device insertion and Pap smears can cause light bleeding that may last for several days.

=== Abnormal uterine bleeding ===
- Menstrual bleeding starts before 21 days or after 35 days
- Menstrual bleeding that lasts more than 7 days
- Heavy menstrual cycle bleeding that necessitates changing pad or tampon roughly every hour (about 80 mL of blood loss) .
- Any bleeding between menstrual cycles, after sexual intercourse or bleeding after six months of menopause
- Premenopausal menstrual bleeding that stops for more than 3 months

== Causes and mechanisms ==
The causes of abnormal uterine bleeding are divided into nine categories (PALM COEIN) under the FIGO System 2 which is the second part of the classification system developed by the International Federation of Gynecology and Obstetrics. More than one category of causes may apply in an individual case.

Causes of abnormal uterine bleeding can also be narrowed down according to age group because each stage of life brings unique changes to an individual's uterine structure and systemic hormones.

Prepubescent group includes all persons with a uterus that have not yet started menstruation (monthly bleeding). Newborn uterine bleeding is a normal occurrence and should gradually stop as estrogen leaves the infant's body. Any bleeding outside of the newborn period is abnormal and should be investigated for a cause, including sexual abuse.

Premenopausal group includes all persons with a uterus that have started and are currently experiencing menstruation.

- Adolescents between the ages of 13 and 19 commonly experience irregular menstrual cycles as their hormones and ovulation cycle regulates. Birth control, coagulopathies, pregnancy, abnormal uterine lining growths and infection are also common causes of abnormal bleeding in this age range.
- Adults between the ages of 20 and 40 most commonly experience abnormal uterine bleeding due to pregnancy and hormonal birth control. Uterine structural abnormalities (See PALM in chart below) ovulatory and endometrial dysregulation are also common causes. Uterine cancer is a rare cause of abnormal uterine bleeding in this group.

Postmenopausal group includes all persons with a uterus that have stopped menstruation for more than one year or 12 consecutive months. Declining ovulatory function or menopause, is the most common cause of abnormal bleeding. Menstrual bleeding becomes gradually less frequent and lighter until it completely stops. Uterine cell wall thinning and overgrowth as well as cancer are common causes for abnormal uterine bleeding concern.

The mechanisms, or reasons, that each of the PALM COEIN abnormalities cause uterine bleeding is not well understood, but the table below includes some scientific hypothesis and observations that give a strong indication of what may be happening.

For more in-depth information about each of these causes, click on the links in the table below.

FIGO System 2 "PALM COEIN " Classifications
	Structural Causes	Description	How this Leads to Abnormal Bleeding
P	Polyps	Condensed tissue overgrowths along the endometrial lining	Possibly due to stromal cell congestion that blocks normal blood flow leading to expulsion of excess blood through the uterus.
A	Adenomyosis	Endometrial tissue invades the uterine muscle causing enlargement	Possibly due to reduction of hormone signaling in response to fibrotic lesions that invade the uterine muscle and cell wall lining meet. Increased angiogenesis and immunological oxidative stress have also been implicated.
L	Leiomyoma (Fibroids)	Non-cancerous smooth muscle cell tumors	Possibly due to increased vasculature (blood vessels) and surface area of uterine lining. Impaired angiogenesis and uterine blood clotting abilities may also contribute.
M	Malignancy (Cancer)	Uterine cancer & Endometrial hyperplasia	Most likely due to long-term exposure to estrogen without simultaneous exposure to progesterone.
	Nonstructural Causes	Description of Cause	How this Leads to Abnormal Bleeding
C	Coagulopathies (Clotting Disorders)	Bleeding disorders impairing the body's blood clotting function. Microbial infection, renal and liver disease, and cancer also contribute.	Improper platelet function and blood clotting factor deficiencies impair uterine ability to create blood clots that prevent excess bleeding.
O	Ovulatory Disorders	Conditions impairing the female body's ability to produce gametes (reproductive eggs).	Possibly due to abnormal increases or decreases of reproductive hormones interrupt the ovulation cycle and prevent appropriate shedding and regeneration of the uterine lining.
E	Endometrial Disorders	Impairment in function of cells that line the uterus that results in excessive bleeding.	Possibly due to vasoconstriction impairment, systemic inflammation or infections.
I	Iatrogenic (Medical Errors)	Bleeding caused by medications or medical procedures. Hormone therapy (contraceptive and non contraceptive) is the most common cause.	Medications and IUD insertions can possibly cause disruption in hormonal regulation of cell wall repair, inflammatory response and blood vessel system of the endometrium.
N	Not Otherwise Classified	Rare impairments such as arteriovenous malformations, endometrial pseudoaneurysms (due to postpartum caesarean scar), myometrial hypertrophy and chronic endometritis.	Irregular connections between arteries and veins in uterus lead to excess bleeding. Pocket of blood can form within uterine scar tissue post C-section.

== Diagnosis ==
Diagnosis of abnormal uterine bleeding starts with a medical history and physical examination. Normal menstrual bleeding patterns vary from woman to woman, so the medical history covers specific details about the woman's individual menstrual bleeding pattern, such as its predictability, length, volume, and whether she experiences cramps or other pain. The healthcare provider will also check to see whether she or any family members have any potentially related health conditions, and whether she is taking medication that might increase or decrease menstrual bleeding, such as herbal supplements, hormonal contraceptives, over-the-counter drugs such as aspirin, or blood thinners.

Medical tests include a blood test, to see whether the abnormal bleeding has caused anemia, and a pelvic ultrasound, to see whether the abnormal bleeding is caused by a structural problem, such as a uterine fibroid. Ultrasound is specifically recommended in those over the age of 35 or those in whom bleeding continues despite initial treatment. Laboratory assessment of thyroid stimulating hormone (TSH), pregnancy, and chlamydia is also recommended.

More extensive testing might include magnetic resonance imaging and endometrial sampling. Endometrial sampling is recommended in those over the age of 45 who do not improve with treatment and in those with intermenstrual bleeding that persists. The PALM-COEIN system may be used to classify the uterine bleeding.

== Management ==
Treatment depends on the underlying cause. Options may include hormonal birth control, gonadotropin-releasing hormone (GnRH) agonists, tranexamic acid, nonsteroidal anti-inflammatory drugs, and surgery such as endometrial ablation or hysterectomy. Polyps, adenomyosis, and cancer are generally treated by surgery. Iron supplementation may be needed.

== Terminology ==
The terminology "dysfunctional uterine bleeding" is no longer recommended. Historically dysfunctional uterine bleeding meant there was no structural or systemic problems present. In abnormal uterine bleeding underlying causes may be present.

== Epidemiology ==
About one-third of all medical appointments with gynecologists involve abnormal uterine bleeding, with the proportion rising to 70% in the years around menopause.
