= Pain and Prejudice =

2019 non-fiction book by Gabrielle Jackson

Pain and Prejudice: How the Medical System Ignores Women and What We Can Do About It
- First edition (UK)
- Author: Gabrielle Jackson
- Original title: Pain and Prejudice: A Call to Arms for Women and Their Bodies
- Published: 2019 (Allen & Unwin - UK); 2019 (Piatkus); 2021 (Greystone Books)
- ISBN: 978-1-77164-716-8

Pain and Prejudice: How the Medical System Ignores Women and What We Can Do About It is a 2019 non-fiction book by Gabrielle Jackson. The book chronicles Jackson's experiences living with endometriosis and adenomyosis and tracks a history of women's health care, specifically in relation to pain. The book was originally published in the UK and Australia under the title Pain and Prejudice: A Call to Arms for Women and Their Bodies.

== Overview ==
Pain and Prejudice expands on Jackson's earlier journalistic writings on her experience with endometriosis and adenomyosis. Jackson broadly explains female anatomy and physiology, including menstruation and menopause. She then provides a history of hysteria and demonstrates how present-day tendencies to treat women in pain as mentally ill arise out of the hysteria tradition. Jackson writes about several under-diagnosed pain-related conditions that appear more frequently in women including endometriosis, adenomyosis, irritable bowel syndrome, migraine, pelvic pain, and auto-immune conditions. The 2021 edition of the book concludes with an epilogue about women's pain and the COVID-19 pandemic.

== Development ==
In 2001, Jackson was diagnosed with endometriosis. Her personal experience with and subsequent research about the disease led Jackson, the then-opinion editor for The Guardian, to launch an investigation into the disease with The Guardian. As part of the investigation, Jackson published an article about her personal experience with endometriosis in 2015. Responses to that article inspired her to investigate how women's pain is treated, mistreated, and ignored by medicine and society.
