= Uterine hypoplasia =

- Other names: Infantile uterus, naive uterus
- Specialty: Gynecology

Uterine hypoplasia is a reproductive disorder where the uterus is smaller than expected (hypoplasia). Infantile uterus is a disorder where an adult uterus has the proportions of an immature uterus; an infantile uterus can be too small (hypoplastic), but can also be of normal size. Both conditions can be related to hypogonadism. They may be treated with hormone therapy using estrogens or with surgery to expand the uterine cavity.

A hypoplastic uterus is smaller than a normal uterus of reproductive age, generally under 6 cm (2.4 in) long, but has normal proportions, with the body of the uterus being twice the size of the cervix (2:1 ratio). An infantile uterus specifically refers to a uterus with proportions similar to those before menarche, with the body size ranging from as large as the cervix (1:1 ratio) to one-half as large as the cervix (1:2 ratio). There is no consensus on exact definitions of either term. One study of 29 women with uterine hypoplasia found that their uteri were cylindrical in shape. The length and shape of the uterus can be measured by ultrasound, while hysteroscopy is used to investigate the interior of the uterus. Magnetic resonance imaging (MRI) and hysterosalpingography (HSG) are also used in investigating and diagnosing uterine hypoplasia.

Uterine hypoplasia is an anomaly of Müllerian duct development. Uterine hypoplasia and infantile uterus can be caused by endocrine problems in adolescence or a lack of female sex hormones. These can delay the development of the uterus. Two studies on the causes of uterine hypoplasia in the 1940s found that most women with uterine hypoplasia had endocrine dysfunction or no response to estrogen. However, one of the studies noted that it was difficult to distinguish between uterine hypoplasia and uterine atrophy, a condition where a fully developed uterus subsequently shrinks. Diethylstilbestrol (DES), a medication intended to prevent miscarriage that was withdrawn in the 1970s for safety issues, has been shown to cause uterine hypoplasia in people who were exposed to it before birth, though the exact mechanism is unknown.

Uterine hypoplasia is categorized together with Müllerian agenesis. Hypoplasia/agenesis is Category I of the American Society for Reproductive Medicine classification of Müllerian anomalies, with subcategories for vaginal (a), cervical (b), fundal (c), tubal (d), and combined (e) hypoplasia or agenesis. It separately lists Müllerian anomalies caused by DES under Category VII. The European ESHRE/ESGE classification places uterine hypoplasia (uterus infantilis) in Class U1b, a subclass of dysmorphic uterus (Class U1).

== See also ==
- Uterine hyperplasia
- Uterine malformation
