= Uterine hyperplasia =

- Differential diagnosis: ovarian cysts, and Endometrial cancer

Uterine hyperplasia, or enlarged uterus, is a medical symptom in which the volume and size of the uterus in a female is abnormally high. It can be a symptom of medical conditions such as adenomyosis, uterine fibroids, ovarian cysts, and endometrial cancer.

== See also ==
- Uterine hypoplasia
