= Adenomyosis =

Extension of endometrial tissue into the myometrium

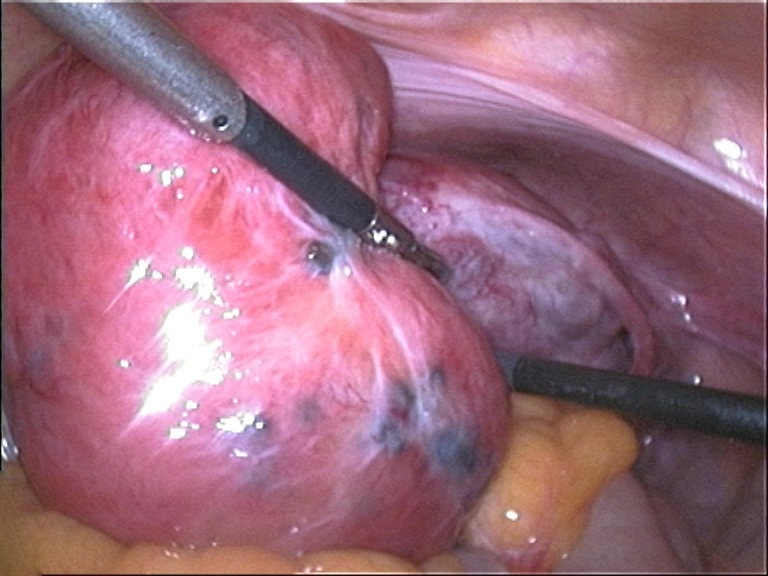
- Adenomyosis uteri seen during laparoscopy: soft and enlarged uterus; the blue spots represent subserous endometriosis.
- Specialty: Gynecology
- Frequency: 20 to 35%.

Adenomyosis is a medical condition characterized by the growth of cells that proliferate on the inside of the uterus (endometrium) atypically located among the cells of the uterine wall (myometrium), as a result, thickening of the uterus occurs. As well as being misplaced in patients with this condition, endometrial tissue is completely functional. The tissue thickens, sheds and bleeds during every menstrual cycle.

The condition is typically found in women between the ages of 35 and 50, but also affects younger women. Patients with adenomyosis often present with painful menses (dysmenorrhea), profuse menses (menorrhagia), or both. Other possible symptoms are pain during sexual intercourse, chronic pelvic pain and irritation of the urinary bladder.

In adenomyosis, basal endometrium penetrates into hyperplastic myometrial fibers. Unlike the functional layer, the basal layer does not undergo typical cyclic changes with the menstrual cycle. Adenomyosis may involve the uterus focally, creating an adenomyoma. With diffuse involvement, the uterus becomes bulky and heavier.

Adenomyosis can be found together with endometriosis; it differs in that patients with endometriosis present endometrial-like tissue located entirely outside the uterus. In endometriosis, the tissue is similar to, but not the same as, the endometrium. The two conditions are found together in many cases yet often occur separately. Before being recognized as a distinct condition, adenomyosis was called endometriosis interna. The less-commonly-used term adenomyometritis is a more specific name for the condition, specifying involvement of the uterus.

== Signs and symptoms ==
Adenomyosis can vary widely in the type and severity of symptoms that it causes, ranging from being entirely asymptomatic 33% of the time to being a severe and debilitating condition in some cases. Women with adenomyosis typically first report symptoms when they are between 40 and 50, but symptoms can occur in younger women.

Symptoms (viz., heavy bleeding and pain) and the estimated percent affected may include:

- Heavy menstrual bleeding (40–60%), which is more common in women with deeper adenomyosis. Blood loss may be significant enough to cause anemia, with associated symptoms of fatigue, dizziness, and moodiness.
- Abnormal uterine bleeding
- Chronic pelvic pain (77%)
- Painful cramping menstruation (15–30%)
- Painful vaginal intercourse, uncommon (7%)
- A 'bearing down' feeling
- Pressure on bladder
- Dragging sensation down thighs and legs

Clinical signs of adenomyosis may include:

- Uterine enlargement (30%), which in turn can lead to symptoms of pelvic fullness.
- Tender uterus
- Infertility or sub-fertility (11–12%) – In addition, adenomyosis is associated with an increased incidence of preterm labour and premature rupture of membranes.

Women with adenomyosis are also more likely to have other uterine conditions, including:

- Uterine fibroids (50%)
- Endometriosis (11%)
- Endometrial polyp (7%)

== Causes ==
The cause of adenomyosis can be associated with Caesarean births, although it has been associated with any sort of uterine trauma that may break the barrier between the endometrium and myometrium, known as the junctional zone, such as a caesarean section, surgical pregnancy termination, and any pregnancy. It can be linked with endometriosis, but studies looking into similarities and differences between these two conditions have conflicting results.

The pathogenesis of adenomyosis still remains unclear, but the functioning of the inner myometrium, also called the junction zone (JZ), is believed to play a major role in the development of adenomyosis. It is also a matter of discussion whether the link between reproductive disorders and major obstetrical disorders also lies here. Parity, age, and previous uterine abrasion increase the risk of adenomyosis. Hormonal factors such as local hyperestrogenism and elevated levels of s-prolactin as well as autoimmune factors have also been identified as possible risk factors. As both the myometrium and stroma in an adenomyosis affected uterus show significant differences from those of a non-affected uterus, a complex origin that includes multifactorial changes on both genetic and biochemical levels is likely.

The tissue injury and repair (TIAR) theory is now widely accepted and suggests that uterine hyperperistalsis (i.e., increased peristalsis), during early periods of reproductive life will induce micro-injury at the endometrial-myometrial interface (EMI) region. That again leads to elevation of local estrogen in order to heal the damage. At the same time, estrogen treatment will increase uterine peristalsis again, leading to a vicious circle and a chain of biological alterations essential for the development of adenomyosis. Iatrogenic injury of the junctional zone or physical damage due to placental implantation most likely results in the same pathological cascade.

== Mechanism ==
=== Pathophysiology ===
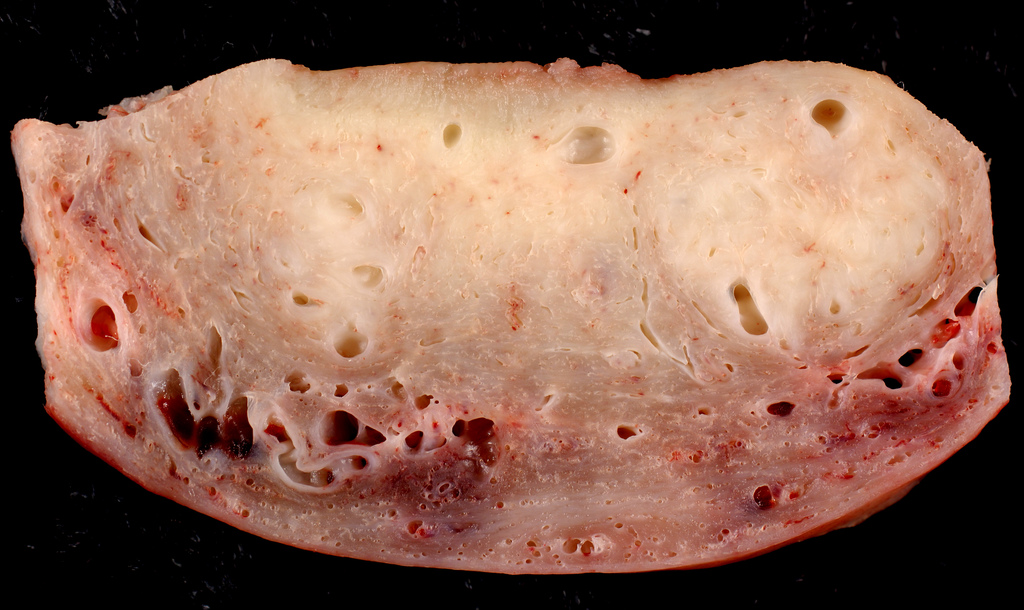
Cross section through the wall of a hysterectomy specimen of a 30-year-old woman who reported chronic pelvic pain and abnormal uterine bleeding. The endometrial surface is at the top of the image, and the serosa is at the bottom.

Misplaced endometrial tissue proliferation in the myometrium causes symptoms through different mechanisms.

Uterine menstrual contractions are caused by prostaglandin, which is produced by normal endometrial tissue. Dysmenorrhea is the main characteristic for this disease which are the result for high prostaglandin levels. Endometrial proliferation is also led by estrogen; some treatments try to reduce its levels in order to decrease symptoms. Adenomyosis patients present with heavy menstrual bleeding due to the increase of endometrial tissue, greater degree of vascularization, atypical uterine contractions and increased levels of prostaglandins, estrogen and eicosanoids.

=== Histopathology ===
The diagnosis of adenomyosis is through a pathologist microscopically examining small tissue samples of the uterus. These tissue samples can come from a uterine biopsy or directly following a hysterectomy. Uterine biopsies can be obtained by either a laparoscopic procedure through the abdomen or hysteroscopy through the vagina and cervix.

The diagnosis is established when the pathologist finds invading clusters of endometrial tissue within the myometrium. Several diagnostic criterion can be used, but typically they require either the endometrial tissue to have invaded greater than 2% of the myometrium, or a minimum invasion depth between 2.5 and 8mm.

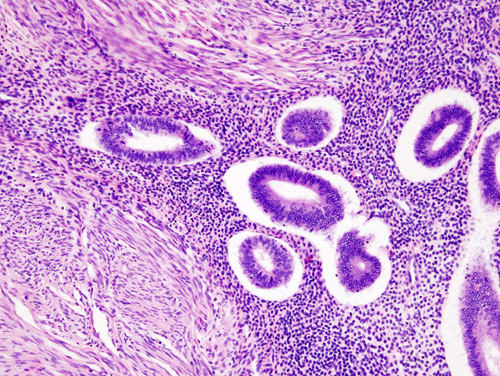
Histopathological image of uterine adenomyosis observed in hysterectomy specimen. Hematoxylin & eosin stain.

Gross findings:

1. Enlarged uterus
2. Thickened uterine wall with trabeculated appearance
3. Hemorrhagic pinpoint or cystic spaces throughout wall

Microscopic findings:

1. Endometrial glands and stroma haphazardly distributed throughout myometrium
2. Concentric myometrial hyperplasia frequent around adenomyotic foci
3. Variants: Gland-poor, stroma-poor, intravascular

Differential diagnosis:

1. Adenomyoma
2. Myo-invasive endometrial endometrioid carcinoma (vs. stroma-poor adenomyosis)
3. Low-grade endometrial stromal sarcoma (vs. gland-poor and intravascular adenomyosis)

== Diagnosis ==
=== Imaging ===
Adenomyosis can vary widely in the extent and location of its invasion within the uterus. As a result, there are no established pathognomonic features to allow for a definitive diagnosis of adenomyosis through non-invasive imaging. Nevertheless, non-invasive imaging techniques such as transvaginal ultrasonography (TVUS) and magnetic resonance imaging (MRI) can both be used to strongly suggest the diagnosis of adenomyosis, guide treatment options, and monitor response to treatment. Indeed, TVUS and MRI are the only two practical means available to establish a pre-surgical diagnosis.

==== Transvaginal ultrasonography ====
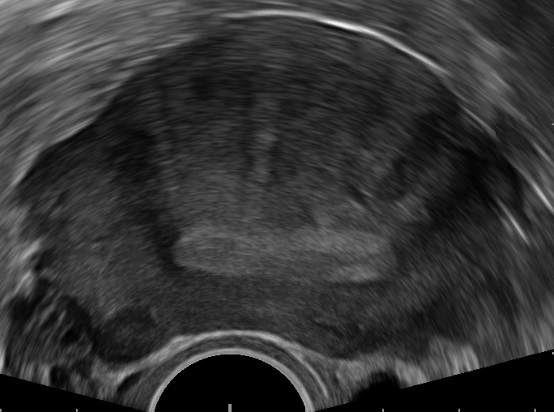
Transvaginal ultrasound of the uterus, showing the endometrium as a hyperechoic (brighter) area in the middle, with linear striations extending upwards from it

Transvaginal ultrasonography is a cheap and readily available imaging test that is typically used early during the evaluation of gynecologic symptoms. Ultrasound imaging, like MRI, does not use radiation and is safe for examination of the pelvis and female reproductive organs. Overall, it is estimated that transvaginal ultrasonography has a sensitivity of 79% and specificity of 85% for the detection of adenomyosis.

Common transvaginal ultrasound findings are defined by the European MUSA group in 2015 and are defined in 2022 by the MUSA group. The ultrasound characteristics can be divided in direct and indirect features.

Direct features:

- myometrial cysts - pockets of fluid within the smooth muscle of the uterus
- Hyperechogenic islands - usually white endometrium islands within the myometrium
- Echogenenic subendometrial lines and buds - usually white lines and knobs attached to the endometrium, protruding into the myometrium.

Indirect features:

- Globular, enlarged, and/or asymmetric uterus
- Fan shaped shadowing - differentiating from fibroids with linear shadowing
- Anterior/posterior wall asymmetry
- Translational vascularity - diffuse spread of small vessels within the myometrium
- Irregular or interrupted junctional zone - the borderline between the endometrium and myometrium

The power Doppler or Doppler ultrasonography function can be used during transvaginal ultrasonography to help differentiate adenomyomas from uterine fibroids. This is because uterine fibroids typically have blood vessels circling the fibroid's capsule. In contrast, adenomyomas are characterized by widespread blood vessels within the lesion. Doppler ultrasonography also serves to differentiate the static fluid within myometrial cysts from flowing blood within vessels.

The junction zone (JZ), or a small distinct hormone-dependent region at the endometrial-myometrial interface, may be assessed by three-dimensional transvaginal ultrasound (3D TVUS) and MRI. Features of adenomyosis are disruption, thickening, enlargement or invasion of the junctional zone. There is no consensus about the actual histology of the junctional zone and a recent review showed that the ultrasound, MRI and histology all define and describe the junctional zone differently.

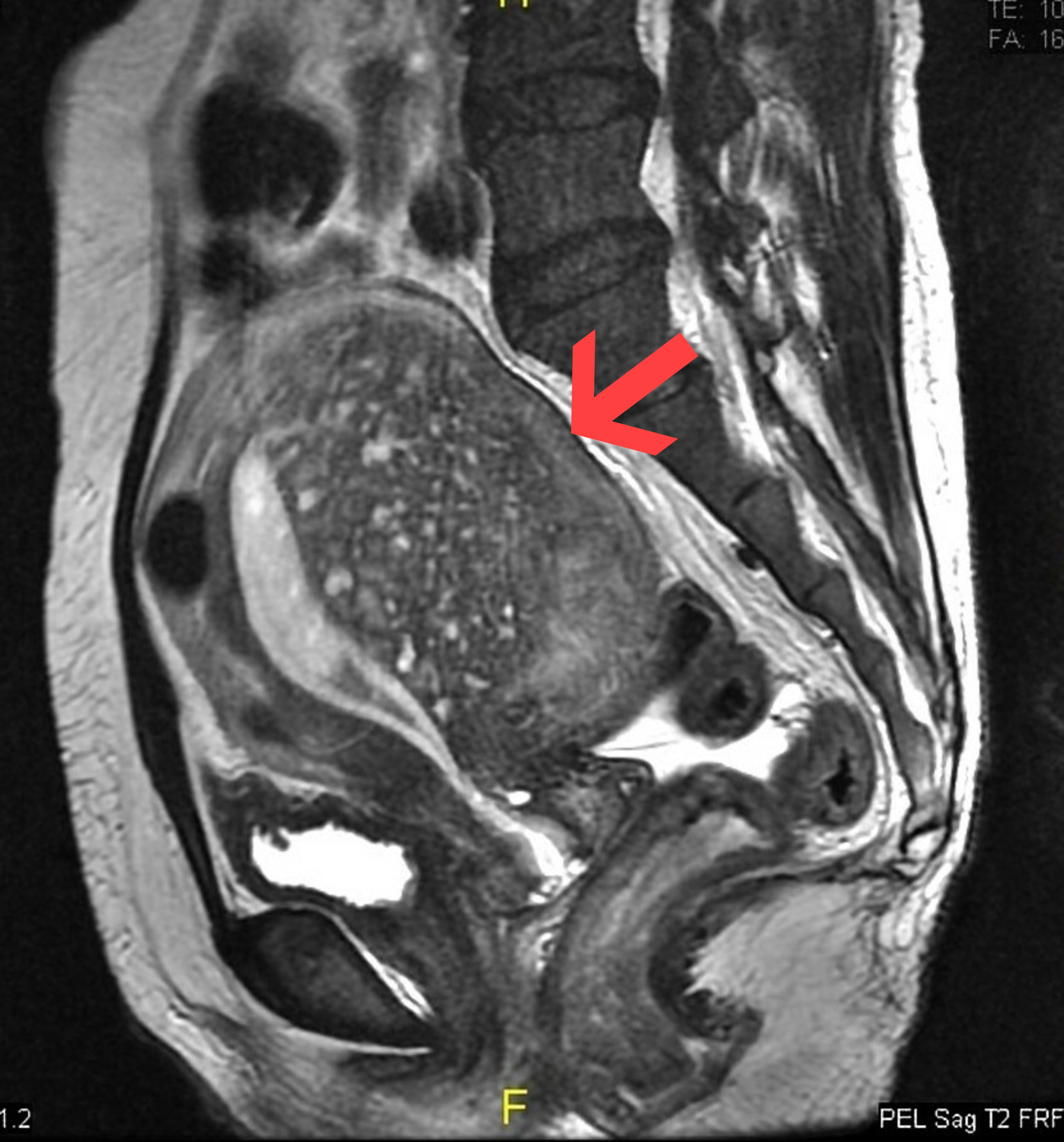
Sagittal MRI of a woman's pelvis showing a uterus with adenomyosis in the posterior wall. Gross enlargement of the posterior wall is noted, with many foci of hyperintensity.

==== Magnetic resonance imaging ====
Magnetic resonance imaging (MRI) provides slightly better diagnostic capability compared to TVUS, due to the increased ability of MRI to differentiate objectively between different types of soft tissue. This is possible with MRI's higher spatial and contrast resolution. Overall, it is estimated that MRI has a sensitivity of 74% and specificity of 91% for the detection of adenomyosis. Diagnosis through MRI focuses predominately upon investigating the junctional zone. The uterus will have a thickened junctional zone with darker/diminished signal on both T1 and T2 weighted sequences.

Three objective measures of the junctional zone can be used to diagnose adenomyosis.

1. A thickness of the junctional zone greater than 8–12 mm. Less than 8 mm is normal.
2. A junctional zone width being greater than 40% of the width of the myometrium.
3. Variability in the width of the junctional zone being greater than 5 mm.

Interspersed within the thickened, darker signal of the junctional zone, one will often see foci of hyperintensity (bright spots) on the T2 weighted scans representing small cystically dilatated glands or more acute sites of microhemorrhage.

MRI is limited by other factors, but not by calcified uterine fibroids (as is ultrasound). In particular, MRI is better able to differentiate adenomyosis from multiple small uterine fibroids.

== Treatment ==
Adenomyosis can only be cured definitively with surgical removal of the uterus. As adenomyosis is responsive to reproductive hormones, it reasonably abates following menopause when these hormones decrease. For women in their reproductive years, adenomyosis can typically be managed with the goals to provide pain relief, to restrict progression of the process, and to reduce significant menstrual bleeding.

=== Medications ===
- NSAIDs: Nonsterioidal anti-inflammatory drugs, such as ibuprofen and naproxen, are commonly used in conjunction with other therapies for pain relief. NSAIDs inhibit the production of prostaglandins by decreasing the activity of the enzyme cyclooxygenase. Prostaglandins have been shown to be primarily responsible for dysmenorrhea or the cramping pelvic pain associated with menses.

==== Hormones and hormone modulators ====
- Levonorgestrel-releasing intrauterine devices or hormonal IUDs, such as the Mirena, are an effective treatment for adenomyosis. They reduce symptoms by causing decidualization of the endometrium, reducing or eliminating menstrual flow. Additionally, by helping downregulate estrogen receptors, hormonal IUDs shrink the clusters of endometrial tissue within the myometrium. This leads to reduced menstrual blood flow, helps the uterus contract more properly, and helps to reduce the menstrual pain. The use of hormonal IUDs in patients with adenomyosis have been proven to reduce menstrual bleeding, improve anemia and iron levels, reduce pain, and even result in an improvement of adenomyosis with a smaller uterus on medical imaging. At least in the short term, patients who can tolerate hormonal IUDs for the treatment of adenomyosis result in equivalent improvement of symptoms and better quality-of-life and social well-being as compared to women who undergo a hysterectomy. Hormonal IUDs are particularly well suited for individuals needing effective treatment of their adenomyosis while still maintaining future fertility potential. The most common negative side-effect of hormonal IUDs is irregular menstrual bleeding or spotting.
- Oral contraceptives reduce the menstrual pain and bleeding associated with adenomyosis. This may require taking continuous hormone therapy to reducing or eliminating menstrual flow. Oral contraceptives may even lead to short-term regression of adenomyosis.
- Progesterone or Progestins: Progesterone counteracts estrogen and inhibits the growth of endometrial tissue. Such therapy can reduce or eliminate menstruation in a controlled and reversible fashion. Progestins are chemical variants of natural progesterone.
- Gonadotropin-releasing hormone (GnRH) agonists and danazol have been tried in order to relieve adenomyosis related symptoms and show some effect, but the studies are few, mainly with a retrospective study design and have small sample sizes. Long-time use of GnRH-analogues is often associated with heavy side effects, loss of bone density and increased risk of cardiovascular events, and therefore not feasible for young women. Furthermore, all present treatment options are irrelevant options for women trying to conceive. Exogenous progestogenic treatments have been found to be ineffective. In IVF-settings long down-regulation prior to IVF might have a positive effect on pregnancy rates.

=== Surgery ===
Broadly speaking, surgical management of adenomyosis is split into two categories: uterine-sparing and non-uterine-sparing procedures. Uterine-sparing procedures are surgical operations that do not include surgical removal of the uterus. Some uterine-sparing procedures have the benefit of improving fertility or retaining the ability to carry a pregnancy to term. In contrast, some uterine-sparing procedures worsen fertility or even result in complete sterility. The impact of each procedure on a woman's fertility is of particular concern and typically guides the selection. Non-uterine-sparing procedures, by definition, include surgical removal of the uterus and consequently they will all result in complete sterility.

==== Uterine-sparing procedures ====
- Uterine artery embolization (UAE): In this minimally-invasive procedure, doctors intentionally block two large arteries that supply the uterus, called the uterine arteries. This is performed in order to dramatically reduce the blood supply to the uterus. By doing so, there is insufficient blood and thus oxygen present for the adenomyosis to develop and spread. 57-75% of women who undergo UAE for adenomyosis typically report long-term improvement in their menstrual pain and bleeding. However, there is a recurrence rate of symptoms in 35% of women following a UAE. Also, UAE has the risk of causing major complications in 5% of women who undergo the procedure. Major complications include infection, significant bleeding, and needing an additional surgery. UAE has also been shown in some cases to reduce ovarian function. Finally, 26% of women who undergo UAE ultimately end up requiring a hysterectomy.
- Myometrium or adenomyoma resection: In this procedure, surgeons remove a focal consolidation of adenomyosis known as an adenomyoma. To be successful this procedure requires that the adenomyosis is relatively focally isolated and with a minimal diffuse spread. Unfortunately, adenomyosis is commonly diffuse and the operation is successful only 50% of the time. The procedure is performed with either a laparoscope or hysteroscope. Additionally, it can be a difficult surgery to perform as diffuse adenomyosis physically weakens the myometrium and surgical sutures can tear through the muscle with minimal force. When successful, the procedure significantly improves menstrual pain and bleeding. Additionally, it can result in improved fertility with pregnancy rates as high as 78% in women trying to conceive after the operation with successful delivery occurring in as many as 69% of those pregnancies. On the other hand, there is an increased miscarriage rate (as high as 39% of pregnancies), which is higher than the general population. This is likely due to increased uterine scar tissue formation caused by the surgery.
- Myometrial electrocoagulation
- Myometrial reduction
- MRI-guided focused ultrasound surgery

==== Endometrial ablation and resection ====
- Endometrial ablation techniques are only for people who do not want to bear any children after having the surgery. The techniques either include physical resection and removal of the endometrium through a hysteroscope, or focus on ablating or killing the endometrial layer of the uterus without its immediate removal. Endometrial ablation and resection techniques are most appropriate for shallow adenomyosis. The efficacy of the procedures is reduced if the adenomyosis is too widespread or deep. Furthermore, deep adenomyosis may become trapped behind a scarred region that was ablated, leading to further bleeding and pain. Endometrial resection is also limited to relatively shallow adenomyosis as significant bleeding may result from damage to large arteries that are present 5 mm deep within the myometrium.
  - Non-hysteroscopic procedures: These techniques do not require a hysteroscope, are relatively fast, and many can be performed as an outpatient procedure.
    - High-energy radiofrequency ablation: Using a small expandable mesh placed within the uterus, providers use high-energy radio waves to ablate the endometrium.
    - Thermal balloon: Using a thin expanding balloon placed within the uterus, providers can introduce heated fluid and ablate the endometrium. This procedure has been shown to result in amenorrhea or complete cessation of menstrual bleeding for 12 months in 23% of patients. 16% of patients eventually experience treatment failure with pain or bleeding requiring additional treatments or a hysterectomy. Women older than 45 and those with milder adenomyosis were more likely to experience successful amenorrhea following the procedure. In contrast, women younger than 45, with multiple childbirths, a history of a prior tubal ligation, and/or a history of menstrual pain were more likely to experience treatment failure.
    - Cryo-endometrial ablation (CEA): A form of cryotherapy whereby using a small probe, providers can directly apply sub-zero temperatures within the uterus to freeze and ablate the endometrium.
    - Circulating Hot Water: Heated water directly introduced into the uterus is used to thermally ablate the endometrium.
    - Microwave ablation: Using a small probe introduced into the uterus, a provider uses microwave energy to ablate the endometrium.
  - Hysteroscopic procedures: These techniques all require the use of a hysteroscope to perform.
    - Wire-loop resection: Under direct visualization through a hysteroscope, a wire loop instrument charged with an electric current permits a provider to carefully remove the endometrium in strips.
    - Laser ablation: Under direct visualization through a hysteroscope, lasers are used to vaporize and ablate the endometrium.
    - Rollerball ablation: Under direct visualization through a hysteroscope, a metallic ball on the end of a probe is charged with electricity and rolled across the surface of the endometrium. This has been shown to have a coagulative effect to the depth of 2–3 mm into the myometrium. This destroys the endometrium and the nearby growth of dysfunctional smooth muscle. Deeper adenomyosis escapes this coagulative effect.

==== Non-uterine-sparing procedures ====
Hysterectomy, or surgical removal of the uterus, has historically been the primary method of diagnosing and treating adenomyosis. It was especially popular in women who had completed their childbearing or in cases where fertility was not desired. Today, there are many more medical and surgical interventions available. These treatments, such as hormonal therapy and endometrial ablation, have significantly reduced the number of women who require a hysterectomy. That being said, hysterectomies remain as the final treatment option for women in whom the other treatments have failed. Typically viewed as definitive treatment for the bleeding and pelvic pain associated with adenomyosis, a hysterectomy will always result in sterility and cessation of menstrual bleeding. Pelvic pain, on the other hand, can persist after a hysterectomy in as many as 22% of women.

There are many different types of hysterectomy, with varying options existing to removal the fallopian tubes, ovaries, and cervix. Also, the varying types of hysterectomy can be performed by many different surgical techniques.

A hysterectomy can be performed:

- laparoscopically through small holes in the abdomen
- robotically in a manner similar to the laparoscopic procedure
- entirely by route of the vagina with no abdominal incisions
- through a larger abdominal incision

Variants also exist which combine several of these techniques and surgeries can even change during the operation from one technique to another in response to unforeseen obstacles or individual anatomy considerations. For example, adenomyosis can increase the size of the uterus to such an extent that it physically cannot be removed through the vagina without first being cut into smaller pieces.

== Epidemiology ==
Recent data suggest a prevalence of 20 to 35%.

== Prognosis ==
Adenomyosis is an often progressing condition. It is advocated that adenomyosis poses no increased risk for cancer development. However, both entities could coexist and the endometrial tissue within the myometrium could harbor endometrioid adenocarcinoma, with potentially deep myometrial invasion.

=== Fertility ===
Preterm labour and premature rupture of membranes both occur more frequently in women with adenomyosis.

In sub-fertile women who received in-vitro fertilization (IVF), women with adenomyosis were less likely to become pregnant and subsequently more likely to experience a miscarriage. Given this, it is encouraged to screen women for adenomyosis by TVUS or MRI before starting assisted reproduction treatments (ART).

== Etymology ==
The term adenomyosis is derived from the Greek terms adeno- (meaning gland), myo- (meaning muscle), and -osis (meaning condition).

== See also ==
- Adenomyoma
- Atypical polypoid adenomyoma
