= Adenomyoma =

- Specialty: Oncology

Adenomyoma is a tumor (-oma) including components derived from glands (adeno-) and muscle (-my-). It is a type of complex and mixed tumor, and several variants have been described in the medical literature. Uterine adenomyoma, the localized form of uterine adenomyosis, is a tumor composed of endometrial gland tissue and smooth muscle in the myometrium. Adenomyomas containing endometrial glands are also found outside of the uterus, most commonly on the uterine adnexa but can also develop at distant sites outside of the pelvis. Gallbladder adenomyoma, the localized form of adenomyomatosis, is a polypoid tumor in the gallbladder composed of hyperplastic mucosal epithelium and muscularis propria.

== Classification ==
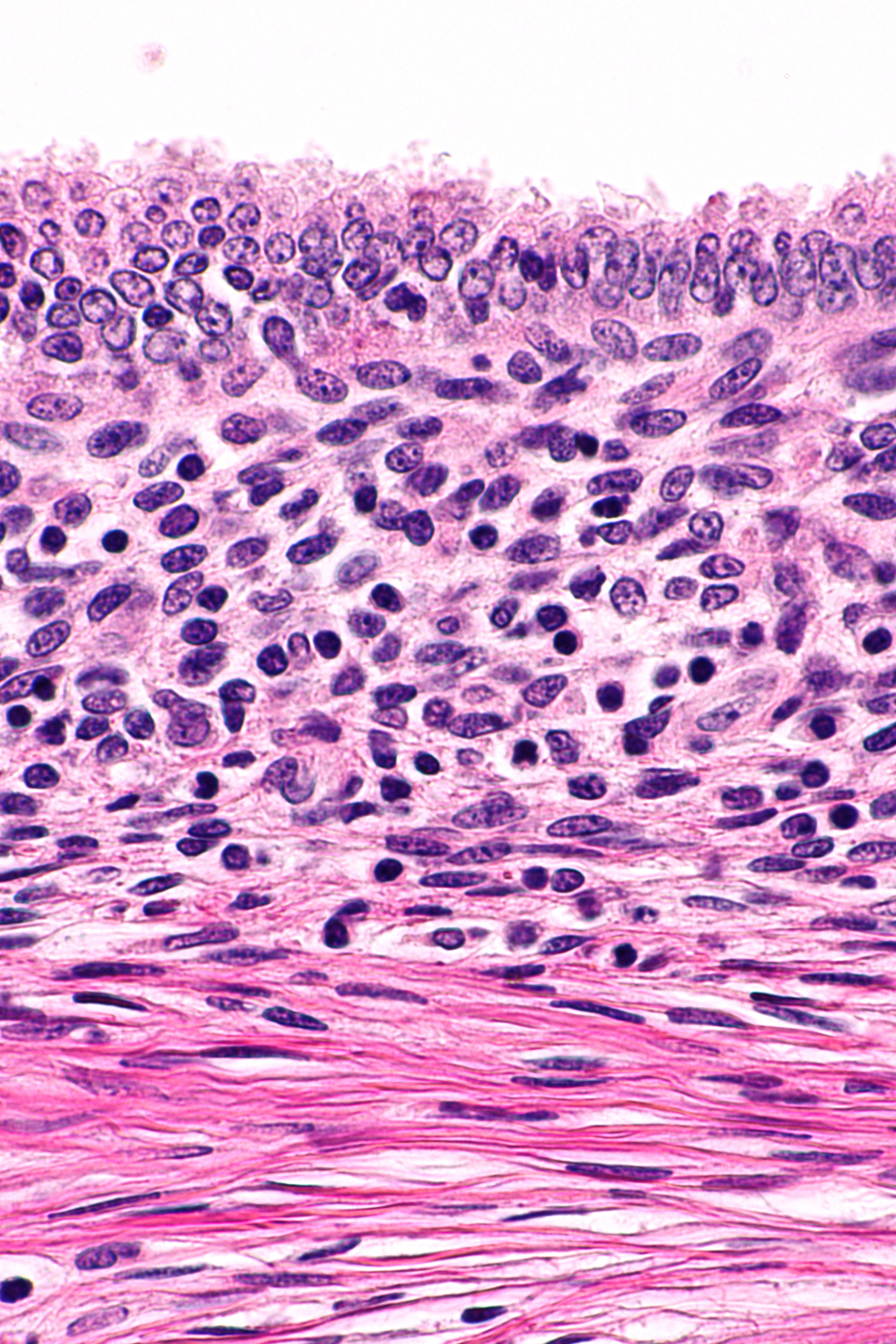
High magnification micrograph of uterine adenomyoma.

=== Uterine Adenomyoma ===
Uterine adenomyoma is the focal form of uterine adenomyosis. Adenomyosis most commonly presents with numerous small collections of endometrial glands and stroma spread diffusely throughout the myometrium, intermixed with the myometrial smooth muscle. In contrast, a uterine adenomyoma is an isolated nodular mass of endometrial tissue with surrounding smooth muscle, either embedded within the myometrium or extending from the endometrium into the uterine cavity in the form of a polyp.

=== Extrauterine Adenomyoma ===
Though less common, adenomyomas with endometrial tissue can also be found outside the uterus. The majority of cases of extrauterine adenomyomas described in the literature have been located in the pelvis, growing on the ovaries, uterine ligaments, and space surrounding the rectum. Several cases have been located outside of the pelvis, such as in the liver, appendix, upper abdomen, and mesentery of the small bowel. There have also been patients with adenomyomas found at multiple locations in the body.

=== Gallbladder Adenomyoma ===
Gallbladder adenomyomatosis is a benign disease of the gallbladder characterized by hyperplasia of the mucosal epithelium and smooth muscle cells inside the muscularis propria. The excessive proliferation of epithelial cells causes the mucosa to invaginate into the muscular layer lining the gallbladder wall, resulting in characteristic diverticula known as Rokitansky-Aschoff sinuses. These sinuses may be filled with biliary sludge, cholesterol crystals, or gallstones.

There are three morphologic variants described in the literature – diffuse, segmental, and localized. Diffuse, also known as generalized, adenomyomatosis has a widespread distribution of hyperplastic changes and thickening across the gallbladder wall. The localized form of adenomyomatosis is also known as a gallbladder adenomyoma (in a similar manner that uterine adenomyoma is the localized variant of adenomyosis). The localized form is a single mass, typically in the fundus, that protrudes into the lumen of the gallbladder in the form of a polyp. The segmental form is characterized by its annular (ring-shaped) distribution of adenomyomatosis in the body of the gallbladder, often giving it an hourglass-like appearance.

== Signs and symptoms ==
=== Uterine Adenomyoma ===
The clinical features of uterine adenomyosis vary widely and may include dysmenorrhea, pelvic pain, menorrhagia, and/or infertility, with about one in three affected women remaining asymptomatic. Women with uterine adenomyomas (focal adenomyosis) more commonly have co-existing endometriosis and a higher likelihood of infertility compared to women presenting with diffuse adenomyosis. However, a causal link between adenomyomas and the development of infertility has not been established, and further investigation is needed.

=== Extrauterine Adenomyoma ===
The most frequent complaint in cases of extrauterine adenomyomas is pain in the pelvis or abdomen, with a small proportion of women also presenting with abnormal bleeding and/or infertility. In half the cases described in the literature, the patient had a history of gynecologic surgery before diagnosis, and several patients also had a medical history of endometriosis.

=== Gallbladder Adenomyoma ===
Most patients with adenomyomatosis are asymptomatic. Among symptomatic patients, the most common symptom is abdominal pain in the right upper quadrant or epigastrium. Patients may also present with nausea, dyspepsia, or fatty food intolerance, likely due to altered flow of bile. Some data suggest that the features of clinical presentation may frequently differ based on the variant of adenomyomatosis, as the diffuse and segmental forms appear to have more significant inflammation and a higher incidence of gallstones compared to the localized form. Other symptoms are often related to frequently co-occurring gallbladder diseases such as gallstones, cholecystitis, and choledocholithiasis. These may present with fever, pain, jaundice, or other symptoms.

== Causes ==
=== Uterine Adenomyoma ===
The underlying cause is not fully understood. A prominent theory is the invagination theory, in which tissue injuries and inflammatory changes due to chronic uterine contractions allow endometrial tissue to pass into the neighboring myometrium. Based on differences in the proteins expressed in adenomyomas located in the inner part of the myometrium versus the outer part of the myometrium, it is possible that adenomyomas can also result from the invasion of ectopic endometrial cells originating from nearby regions of endometriosis.

=== Extrauterine Adenomyoma ===
No exact risk factors have been described for adenomyomas that develop outside the uterus. A history of prolonged hormone therapy is reported in two cases of patients diagnosed with an extrauterine adenomyoma, including estrogen and a gonadotropin releasing hormone (GnRH) agonist. Though adenomyosis has demonstrated sensitivity to estrogen, further investigation is needed to explore the relationship between hormone therapy and extrauterine adenomyomas.

Several theories have been hypothesized to explain the pathogenesis. One theory describes extrauterine adenomyomas resulting from an error in Müllerian duct fusion during embryonic development, resulting in an abnormal uterus containing a horn-like structure. This horn may then be prone to breaking away and depositing elsewhere, later developing into an adenomyoma. As errors in Müllerian duct fusion also impact the development of the kidneys, urinary tract, and genitals, this theory would explain the multiple cases of extrauterine adenomyomas with co-existing congenital abnormalities of these anatomic structures.

Another theory suggests that extrauterine adenomyomas may result from smooth muscle metaplasia in areas of pre-existing endometriosis. In this theory, areas of endometrial tissue that have developed outside the uterus (endometriosis) undergo cellular changes that provide the muscular component of the adenomyoma.

=== Gallbladder Adenomyoma ===
The specific cause of gallbladder adenomyomatosis remains unclear. Some of the risk factors for gallstone formation have also been reported in patients with adenomyomatosis such as hemolytic disease, congenital biliary abnormalities, obesity, and inflammatory bowel disease, but whether these are also risk factors for adenomyomatosis requires further investigation.

The disease is currently thought to be a degenerative process and unlikely to be the result of congenital malformation. The cell proliferation seen in adenomyomatosis is theorized to result from increased pressure inside the gallbladder due to abnormal muscle contractions or excessive absorption of bile by the gallbladder wall.

== Diagnosis ==
=== Uterine Adenomyoma ===
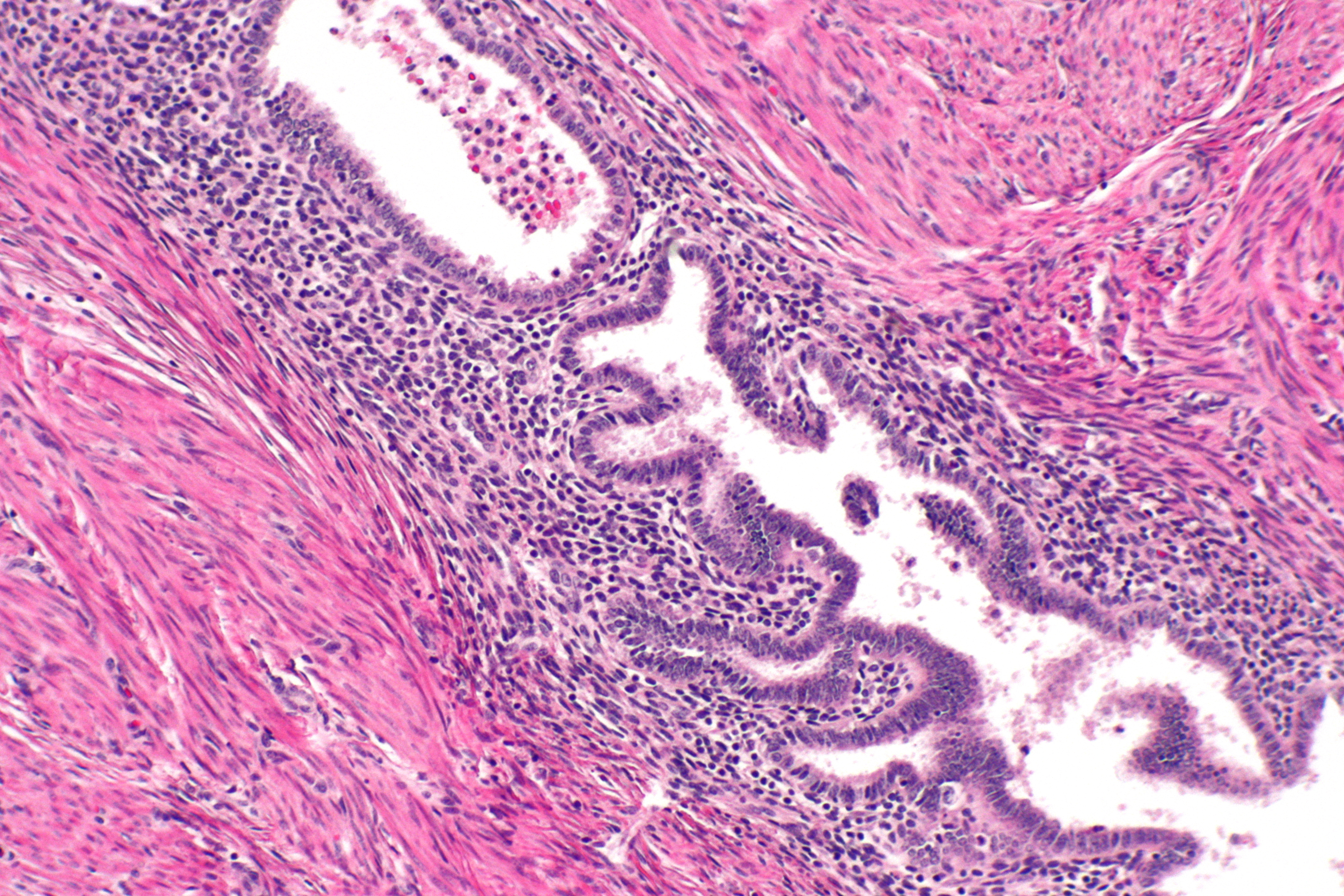
Histopathology of uterine adenomyosis. H&E stain.

The most common diagnostic imaging modalities for uterine adenomyosis include transvaginal ultrasonography (TVS) and magnetic resonance imaging (MRI). Though surgical excision and microscopic examination of the tumor allow for a definitive diagnosis, these imaging studies offer a non-invasive approach and have a sufficient resolution for a diagnosis.

Diagnosis with transvaginal ultrasonography can potentially be challenging due to the similar appearance of uterine leiomyomas (also known as uterine fibroids). Careful evaluation of the margins of the mass, the vascular flow patterns through the tumor, and the degree to which the tumor distorts the uterus may aid in differentiating these masses with ultrasound. MRI is highly effective at distinguishing between uterine adenomyomas and leiomyomas.

=== Extrauterine Adenomyoma ===
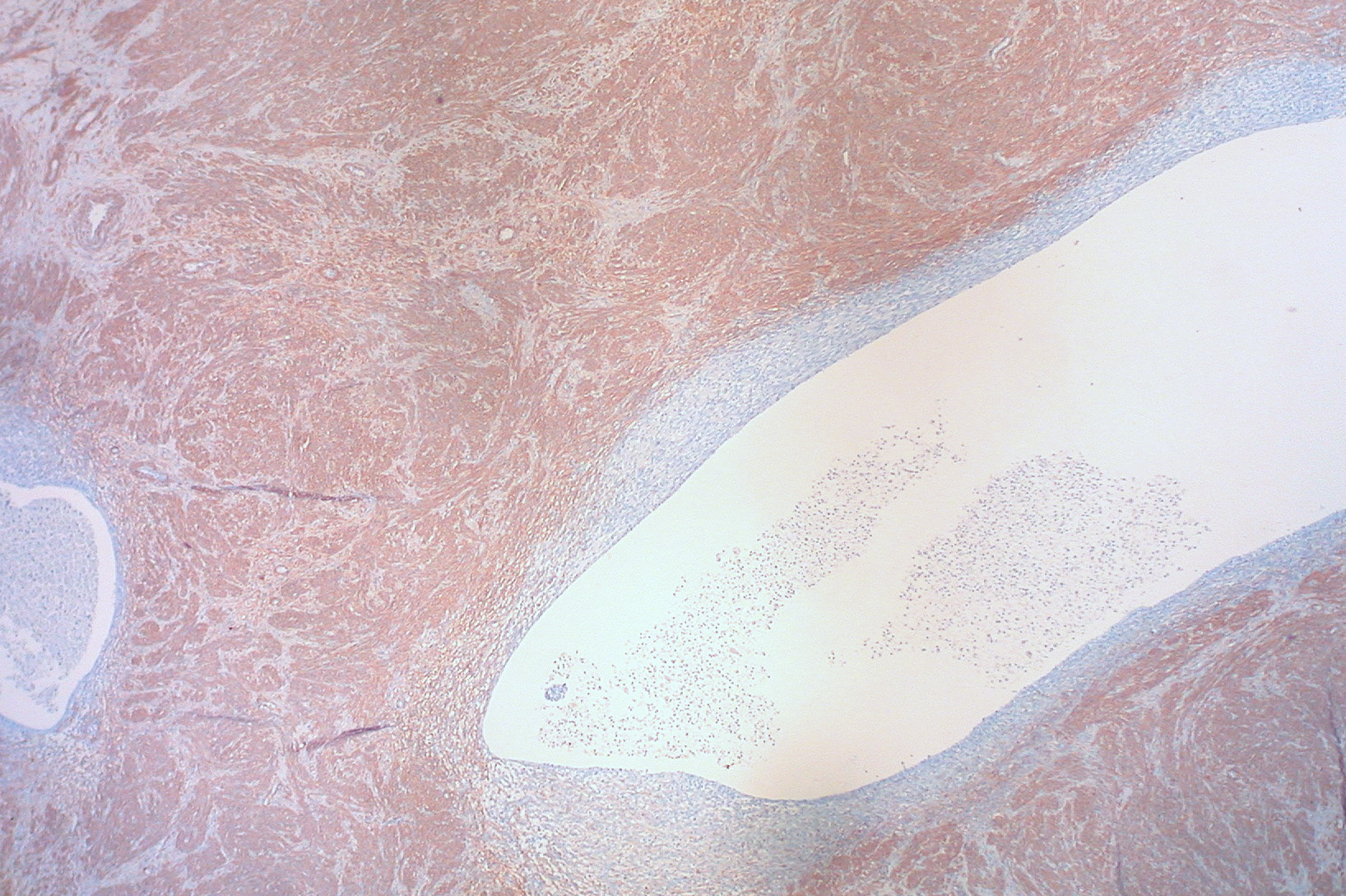
Adenomyoma of the ovary. Smooth muscle actin immunostain.

The most common imaging techniques include ultrasound, computed tomography (CT), and MRI. Intravenous pyelography (IVP) has also been used in some cases to assess for possible congenital anomalies of the kidneys. The appearance of these rare tumors on diagnostic imaging has not been extensively described, and in each case documented in the literature, the diagnosis was ultimately made after surgical removal using histologic analysis.

On microscopic examination, patterns of smooth muscle and endometrial tissue must be assessed with care to differentiate adenomyomas from masses of similar appearances, such as endometriosis containing smooth muscle and leiomyomas containing endometriosis.

=== Gallbladder Adenomyoma ===
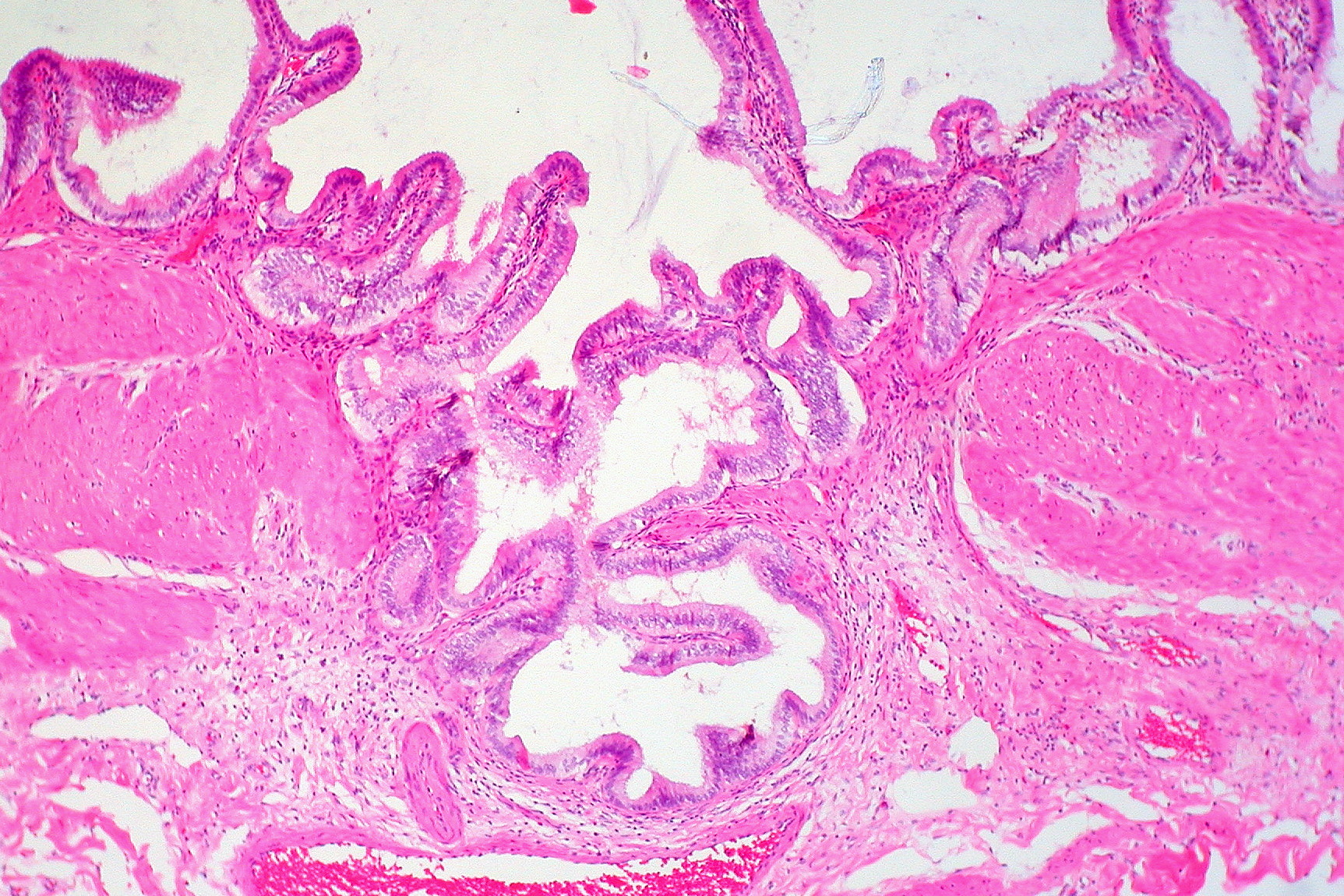
Rokitansky-Aschoff Sinus, Gallbladder Adenomyomatosis

Adenomyomatosis is frequently associated with gallstones and is often diagnosed incidentally, either from a cholecystectomy specimen or autopsy. No serologic test exists to specify adenomyomatosis and laboratory studies are often normal. Co-existing diseases like cholecystitis may result in abnormal test results, such as elevated levels of white blood cells (leukocytosis), liver enzymes (transaminitis), or bilirubin (hyperbilirubinemia).

Ultrasound is the preferred initial diagnostic choice for suspected gallbladder disease. Several distinct features of adenomyomatosis are discernable using ultrasound, making it a reliable modality for diagnosis. The most characteristic features seen on ultrasound are the Rokitansky-Aschoff sinuses, which present either as echogenic foci when filled with biliary sludge/gallstones or anechogenic foci when filled with normal bile. Other key features that may be seen include wall thickening and ring-down artifacts known as "comet tails" (produced by reverberations of sound between the sinuses). Ultrasound can also distinguish between diffuse, segmental, and localized variants of adenomyomatosis based on morphology.

In some cases, gallbladder wall thickening may be seen on ultrasound but is poorly defined and lacking specificity, particularly if the characteristic Rokitansky-Aschoff sinuses are not visualized. This can make it difficult to distinguish adenomyomatosis from other conditions that result in gallbladder wall thickening such as gallbladder cancer. In these cases, MRI can prove helpful in providing the resolution needed for diagnosis. Especially effective is the T2-weighted MRI at visualizing the pathognomonic Rokitansky-Aschoff sinuses, which appear as round-shaped hyperintense cystic spaces that align in a curvilinear fashion along the gallbladder wall in a pattern described as the ”pearl necklace sign”.

== Treatment ==
=== Uterine Adenomyoma ===
Multiple medical and surgical approaches have been explored to treat uterine adenomyomas, and a patient’s symptoms and reproductive preferences must be considered carefully when choosing the most appropriate therapy. Medical treatments include nonsteroidal anti-inflammatory drugs (NSAIDs) used for pelvic and menstrual pain and hormonally active medications such as progestins, estrogen-containing contraceptives, and gonadotropin releasing hormone agonists. These hormonal drugs target sex hormones that help govern the growth of endometrial tissue found in adenomyomas.

A variety of effective procedures are also available if medical therapy is unsuccessful. These include minimally invasive procedures like high-intensity focused ultrasound or uterine artery embolization and more invasive options such as endometrial ablation or hysterectomy. Adenomyomectomy, a conservative surgery that removes the localized tumor but leaves the surrounding healthy uterus intact, is a potential uterine-sparing option for women with a uterine adenomyoma who wish to preserve their fertility, as some of the previously listed interventions decrease or eliminate the probability of successful future childbearing.

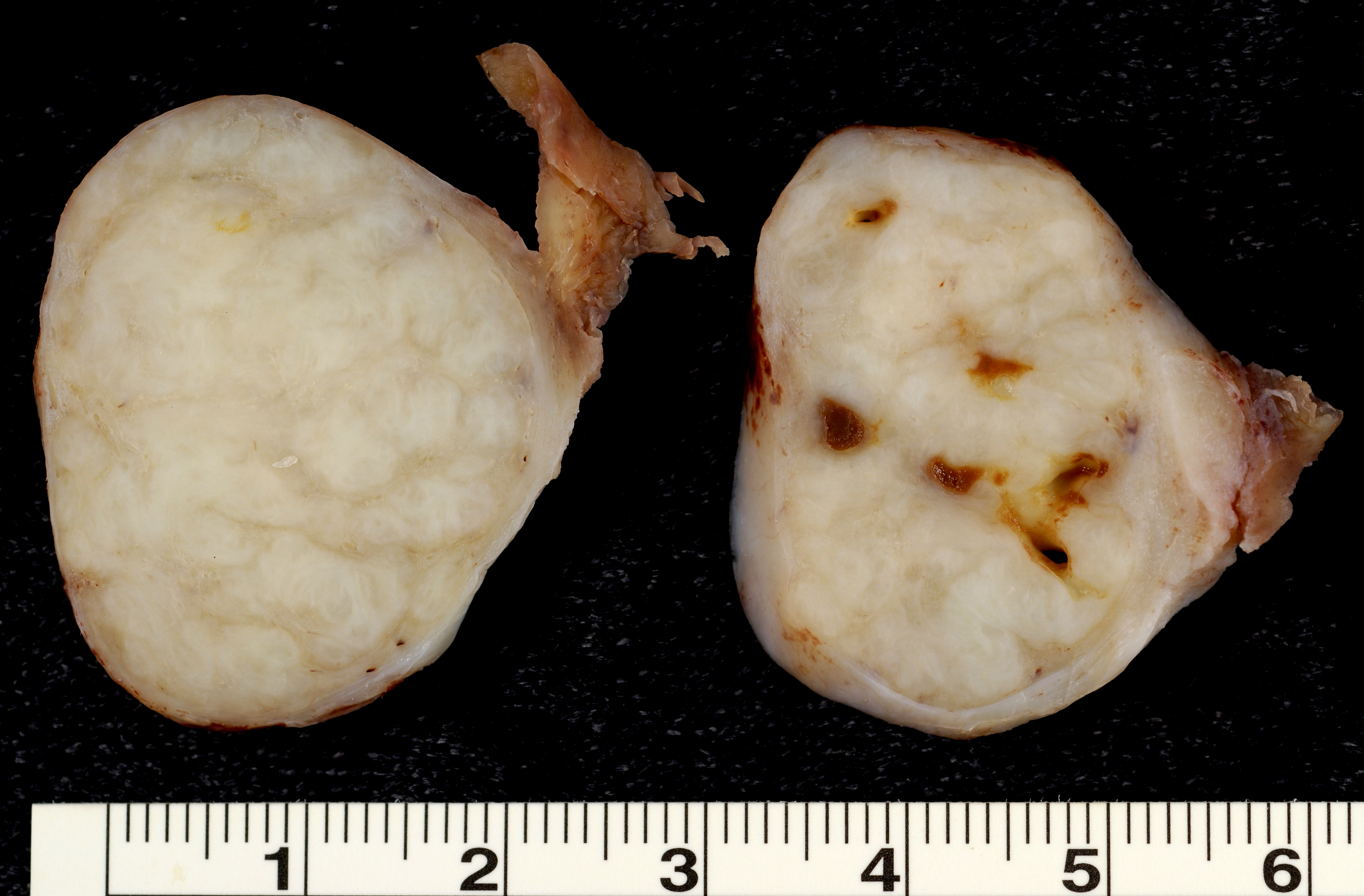
Adenomyoma of the ovary. Surgical specimen.

=== Extrauterine Adenomyoma ===
Surgical intervention serves as the main diagnostic and treatment approach. The surgical technique applied for tumor excision highly depends on the mass’s location, with gynecologic surgeries such as hysterectomy and salpingo-oophorectomy a common choice for pelvic adenomyomas. Hormone therapy has also been combined with surgery in several cases, such as gonadotropin releasing hormone agonists, progesterone, and aromatase inhibitors.

=== Gallbladder Adenomyoma ===
Cholecystectomy, or surgical removal of the gallbladder, is the recommended treatment for patients with symptomatic adenomyomatosis. There is a lack of consensus as to the optimal management of asymptomatic patients, largely due to uncertainties about the possible role of adenomyomatosis in the development of gallbladder cancer. Several sources recommend surgery in cases where adenomyomatosis is difficult to distinguish from malignancy on diagnostic imaging. If well visualized diagnostically, the morphology of the lesion (diffuse/segmental/localized forms) may be an important factor in deciding between a surgical and conservative approach.

== Prognosis ==
=== Uterine Adenomyoma ===
Although several treatments have demonstrated long-term improvements in symptoms such as pelvic pain and menorrhagia, there is no clear consensus on the optimal treatment based on the type of adenomyosis, and few studies distinguish between diffuse and focal adenomyosis.

Though uterine-sparing surgery is not feasible for diffuse adenomyosis because of the widespread distribution of disease throughout the uterus, it is a possibility for focal adenomyosis due to the localized nature of the adenomyoma. However, these surgeries are performed with caution due to the complexity and potential for uterine rupture due to loss of tensile strength after surgery. There are a small number of studies that have demonstrated improved outcomes in pregnancy when combining conservative surgery with GnRH agonist therapy compared to either method alone.

Patients with adenomyosis have been found to have lower successful live birth rates and higher rates of miscarriage following in vitro fertilization (IVF) compared to those without adenomyosis. Multiple studies have investigated the impact of GnRH agonist therapy on in vitro fertilization success in patients with adenomyosis. One study assessing patients with adenomyosis receiving fresh embryo transfer demonstrated different outcomes between diffuse and focal adenomyosis when treated with prolonged GnRH therapy prior to in vitro fertilization. Women with diffuse adenomyosis had higher pregnancy and live birth rates following prolonged GnRH therapy, whereas women with focal adenomyosis demonstrated no benefit. However, there are other studies with conflicting data based on the method of embryo transfer (such as frozen-thawed embryo transfer versus fresh embryo transfer) and no optimized treatment protocol has been established for patients with adenomyosis receiving fertility treatment.

In the case of juvenile cystic adenomyoma, laparoscopic enucleation results in a statistically and clinically significant reduction in dysmenorrhea, ease in any chronic pelvic pain, and low risk of recurrence.

=== Extrauterine Adenomyoma ===
Long-term outcomes after treatment are sparsely represented in prior studies, though a small number of cases reported recurrence of adenomyomas after surgery. In addition, some patients with extrauterine adenomyomas, particularly of the ovaries and uterine ligaments, also presented with malignant growths in the ovaries or uterus.

=== Gallbladder Adenomyoma ===
Though itself considered a benign disease, the potential role of gallbladder adenomyomatosis in the carcinogenesis of gallbladder cancer remains unclear. Previous studies have highlighted several cases of adenomyomatosis associated with gallbladder malignancy, with a particularly strong correlation between segmental adenomyomatosis and gallbladder carcinoma. Further studies are required to further elucidate the relationship between adenomyomatosis and cancer.

== Epidemiology ==
=== Uterine Adenomyoma ===
Data collected from over 300,000 women in the United States suggest an incidence of about 1% for adenomyosis. The demographic with the highest incidence in this retrospective cohort study were black women and women aged 40–45 years, with women in their early 40s the most likely to be symptomatic.

=== Extrauterine Adenomyoma ===
Much less common than the intrauterine counterpart, one review found 34 cases of extrauterine adenomyoma described in the literature. The ages of affected women at diagnosis have had a wide range from 17 to 70 years.

=== Gallbladder Adenomyoma ===
Adenomyomatosis is discovered in approximately 5% of cholecystectomy specimens. Most patients who are diagnosed are in their 50s or older, with a rare few cases found in children.

== See also ==
- Atypical polypoid adenomyoma
- Adenomyosis
- Adenomyomatosis
