= Atypical polypoid adenomyoma =

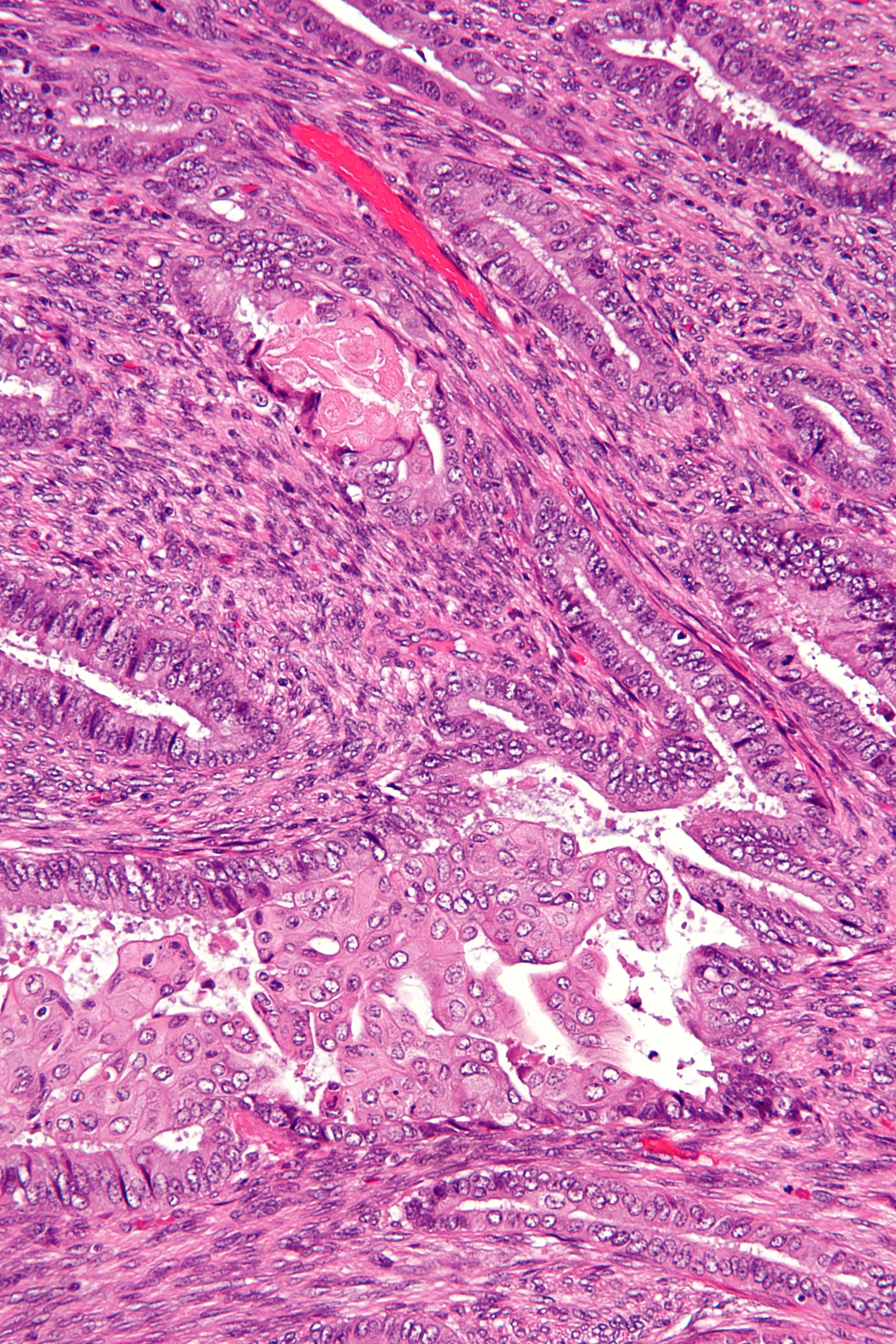
- Micrograph of an atypical polypoid adenomyoma. H&E stain.
- Specialty: Pathology

Atypical polypoid adenomyoma (APA) is a rare benign tumour of the uterus.

== Pathology ==
APAs are characterized by glands with abnormal shapes that: (1) often have squamous metaplasia, and (2) are surrounded by benign smooth muscle. Nuclear atypia, if present, is mild.

The microscopic differential diagnosis includes endometrial carcinoma and endocervical adenocarcinoma.

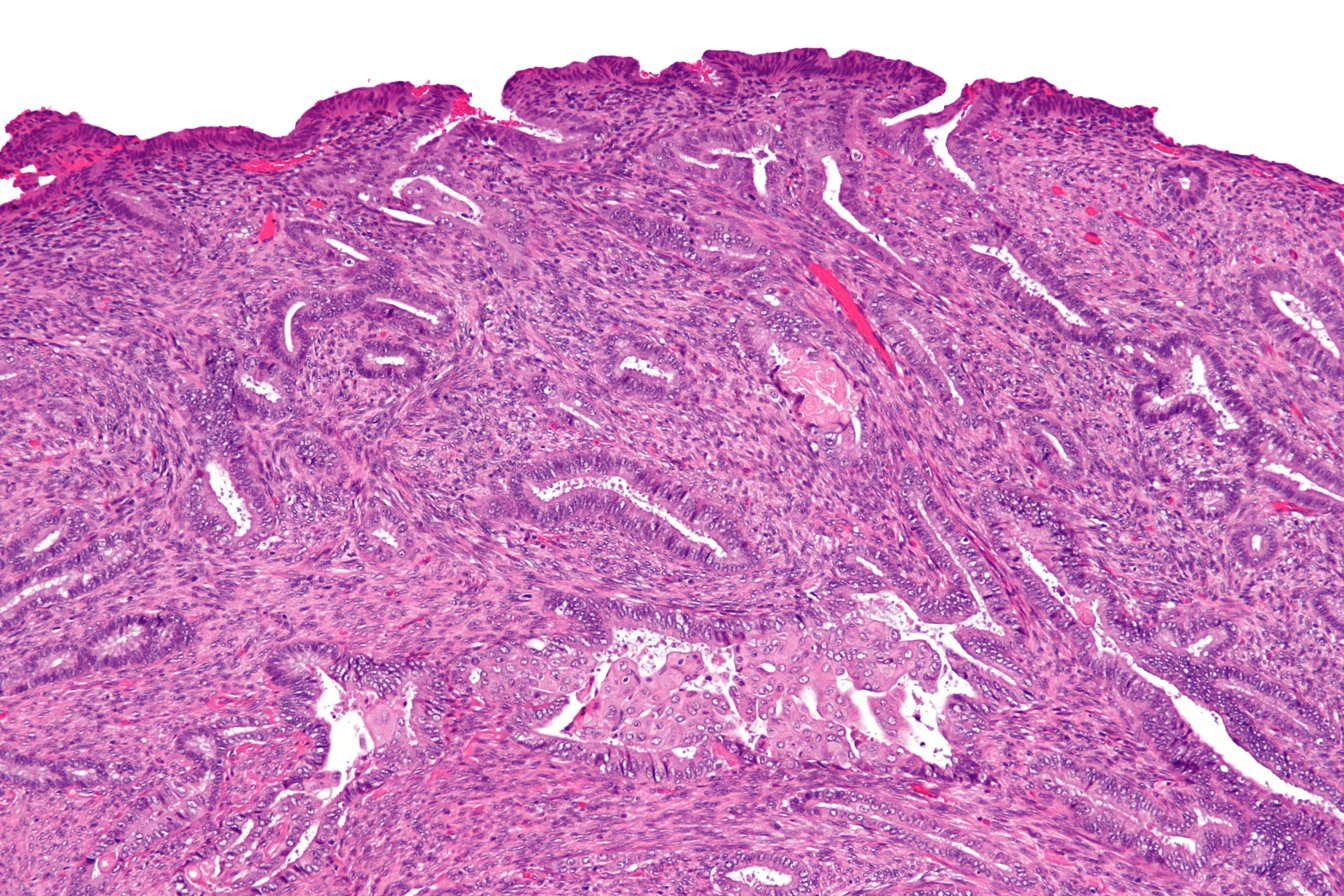
Intermed. mag.

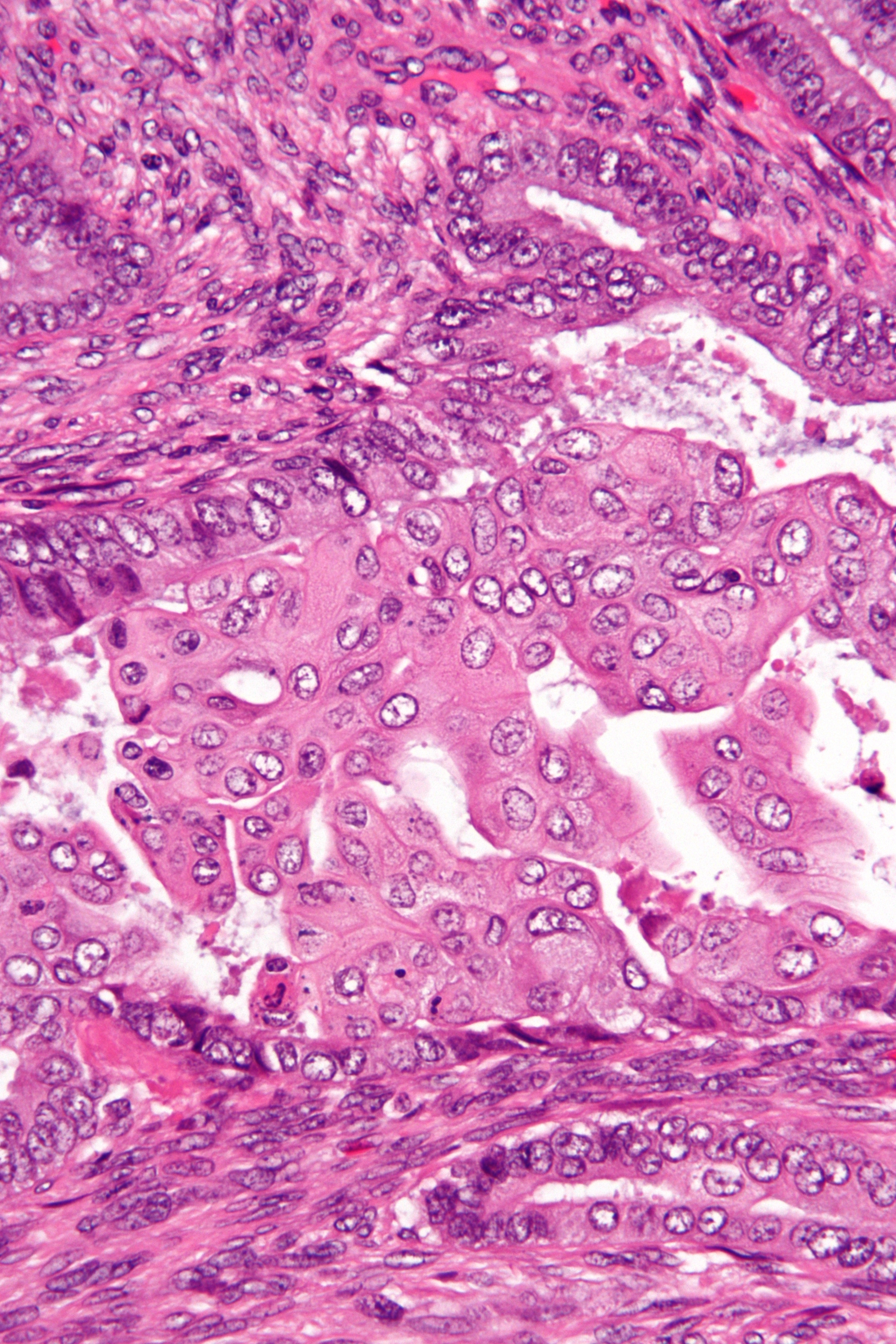
Very high mag.

== See also ==
- Adenomyoma
- Cervical cancer
