= Gustave Moreau =

French Symbolist painter (1826–1898)

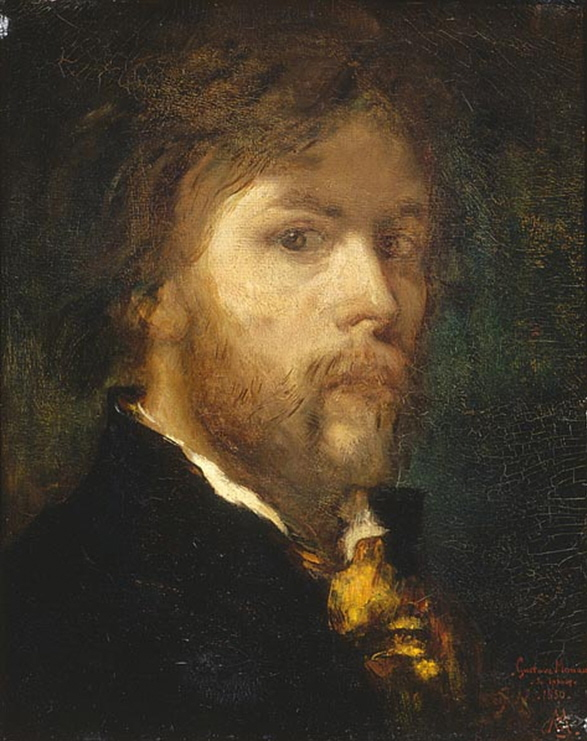
- Self-portrait of Gustave Moreau, 1850
- Born: 6 April 1826; Paris, France
- Died: 18 April 1898 (aged 72); Paris, France
- Education: Collège Rollin (Collège-lycée Jacques-Decour) Ecole des Beaux-Arts, François-Édouard Picot
- Known for: Painting
- Notable work: Oedipus and the Sphinx (1864); L'Apparition (1876); Salome Dancing before Herod (1876); Jupiter and Semele (1894–95)
- Movement: Symbolism

Gustave Moreau (French: [ɡystav mɔʁo]; 6 April 1826 – 18 April 1898) was a French artist and an important figure in the Symbolist movement. Jean Cassou called him "the Symbolist painter par excellence". He was an influential forerunner of symbolism in the visual arts in the 1860s, and at the height of the symbolist movement in the 1890s, he was among the most significant painters. Art historian Robert Delevoy wrote that Moreau "brought symbolist polyvalence to its highest point in Jupiter and Semele." He was a prolific artist who produced over 15,000 paintings, watercolors, and drawings. Moreau painted allegories and traditional biblical and mythological subjects favored by the fine art academies. J. K. Huysmans wrote, "Gustave Moreau has given new freshness to dreary old subjects by a talent both subtle and ample: he has taken myths worn out by the repetitions of centuries and expressed them in a language that is persuasive and lofty, mysterious and new." The female characters from the Bible and mythology that he so frequently depicted came to be regarded by many as the archetypical symbolist woman. His art (and symbolism in general) fell from favor and received little attention in the early 20th century but, beginning in the 1960s and 70s, he has come to be considered among the most paramount of symbolist painters.

Gustave Moreau was born in Paris and showed an aptitude for drawing at an early age. He received a sound education at Collège Rollin (now Collège-lycée Jacques-Decour) and traditional academic training in painting at the Ecole des Beaux-Arts. In the early 1850s he developed a close friendship/mentorship with Théodore Chassériau and had some modest success exhibiting as the Paris Salon. Chassériau's premature death in 1856 deeply affected Moreau, and he left Paris to travel in Italy from 1857 to 1859, returning with hundreds of copies and studies he made of old master paintings there. In 1864 his painting Oedipus and the Sphinx received a great deal of attention at the Paris Salon, winning a medal and establishing his reputation. He had continued success through the 1860s, gradually gaining a select group of enthusiastic and loyal admirers and collectors. Although his painting Prometheus received a medal at the Salon of 1869, criticisms in the press were severe and he did not submit paintings to the Salon again until 1876, permanently withdrawing after 1880.

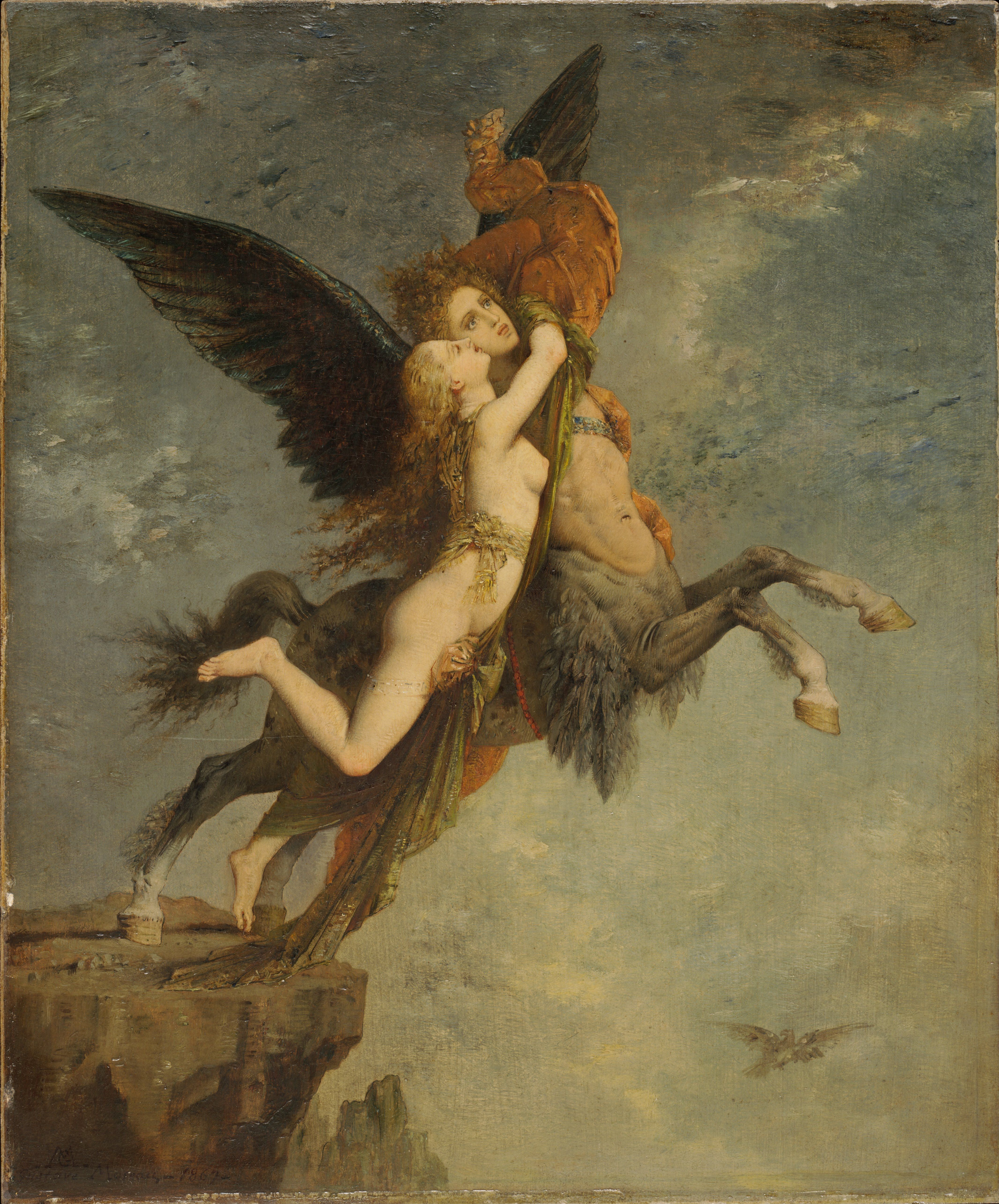
The Chimera (1867), oil on panel, 33 x 27.3 cm., Fogg Museum

Moreau was decorated Officier de la Légion d'Honneur in 1883. Somewhat misanthropic, he grew increasingly reclusive in later years, although he maintained a close circle of friends. He was often reluctant to sell his work, seldom exhibited, and turned down a number of prestigious offers, including an invitation to exhibit at the Salon Les XX in Brussels (1887), rejected the post of a professor when he was elected to the Ecole des Beaux-Arts (1888), and rejected offers to decorate buildings at the Sorbonne (1891). It was only after the death of his friend Élie Delaunay in 1891 that he agreed to take over Delaunay's studio at the Ecole des Beaux-Arts. Moreau excelled as a teacher, counting Henri Matisse, Georges Rouault, and other notable artists amongst his pupils. His parents bought a townhouse in 1852 at 14 Rue de La Rochefoucauld, converting the top floor into a studio for Moreau, where he lived and worked, a bachelor, for the rest of his life, his father dying in 1862, and his mother, Adèle-Pauline in 1884. Moreau died of cancer in 1898, bequeathing the townhome and studio with nearly 1200 paintings and watercolors, and over 10,000 drawings to the State to be converted into a museum. The Musée Gustave Moreau opened to the public in 1903 and is still open today. It is by far the largest and most significant collection of his work.

== Biography ==
=== Education and early career (1826–1856) ===
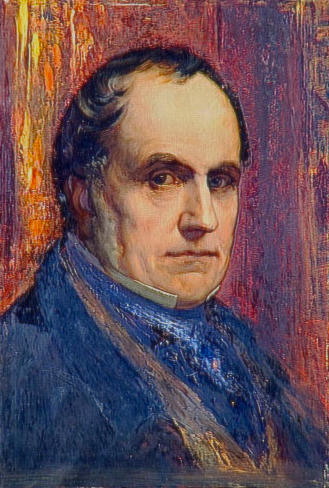
Louis Moreau (c. 1850), oil on canvas, 45 x 31 cm., Musée Gustave Moreau

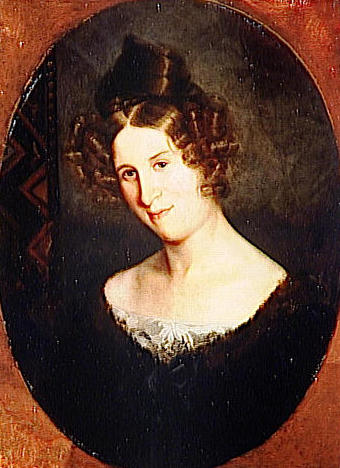
Pauline Moreau (no date), oil on canvas, Musée Gustave Moreau

Gustave Moreau was born in Paris, into a cultured, upper-middle-class family. His father, Louis Jean Marie Moreau (1790–1862), was an architect, and his mother, née Adèle Pauline Desmoutier (1802–1884) was a musician. During a turbulent period in French history his father worked for the city of Paris, but being of liberal leanings, he was at times dismissed and later reinstated from various offices as powers shifted. The family lived in Vesoul, France from 1827 to 1830. After the July Revolution of 1830, he was appointed highway commissioner for the city of Paris. Although the office was not highly revered, his duties were more varied than the title suggests and he remained there until he retired in 1858. As a child Moreau was of frail health. Beginning at about the age of eight, he started drawing incessantly. In 1837 he began attending the Collège Rollin (Collège-lycée Jacques-Decour) in Paris as a boarder, but in 1840 when his older sister died at the age of 13, he was withdrawn from the school and lived a somewhat sheltered life with his parents. His father encouraged and supported his artistic tendencies but was adamant that he received a solid classical education. Moreau learned Greek, Latin, and read both French and classical literature in his father's rather substantial library. He learned piano and was a very good tenor. In 1841 he visited Italy with his mother and relatives, where he filled a 60-page album with drawings.

Visiting museums and galleries in Italy profoundly impressed Moreau and influenced his resolution to pursue a career as an artist. Upon returning in 1841 he started attending a drawing studio in the evenings. In 1844 he entered the private studio of François-Édouard Picot, a member of the École des Beaux-Arts, who offered classes to aspiring young artists to prepare for the entrance examinations at the École des Beaux-Arts. In 1846 Moreau was admitted to Picot's formal class at the École des Beaux-Arts. Moreau had grand aspirations of winning the prestigious Grand Prix de Rome, but when he failed to make the final rounds in 1848 and 1849 he left the École des Beaux-Arts prematurely. His style soon drifted away from those favored by the academy, but many of the basic Beaux-Arts methods and concepts he learned would remain with him for the rest of his life, as would his commitment to history painting.

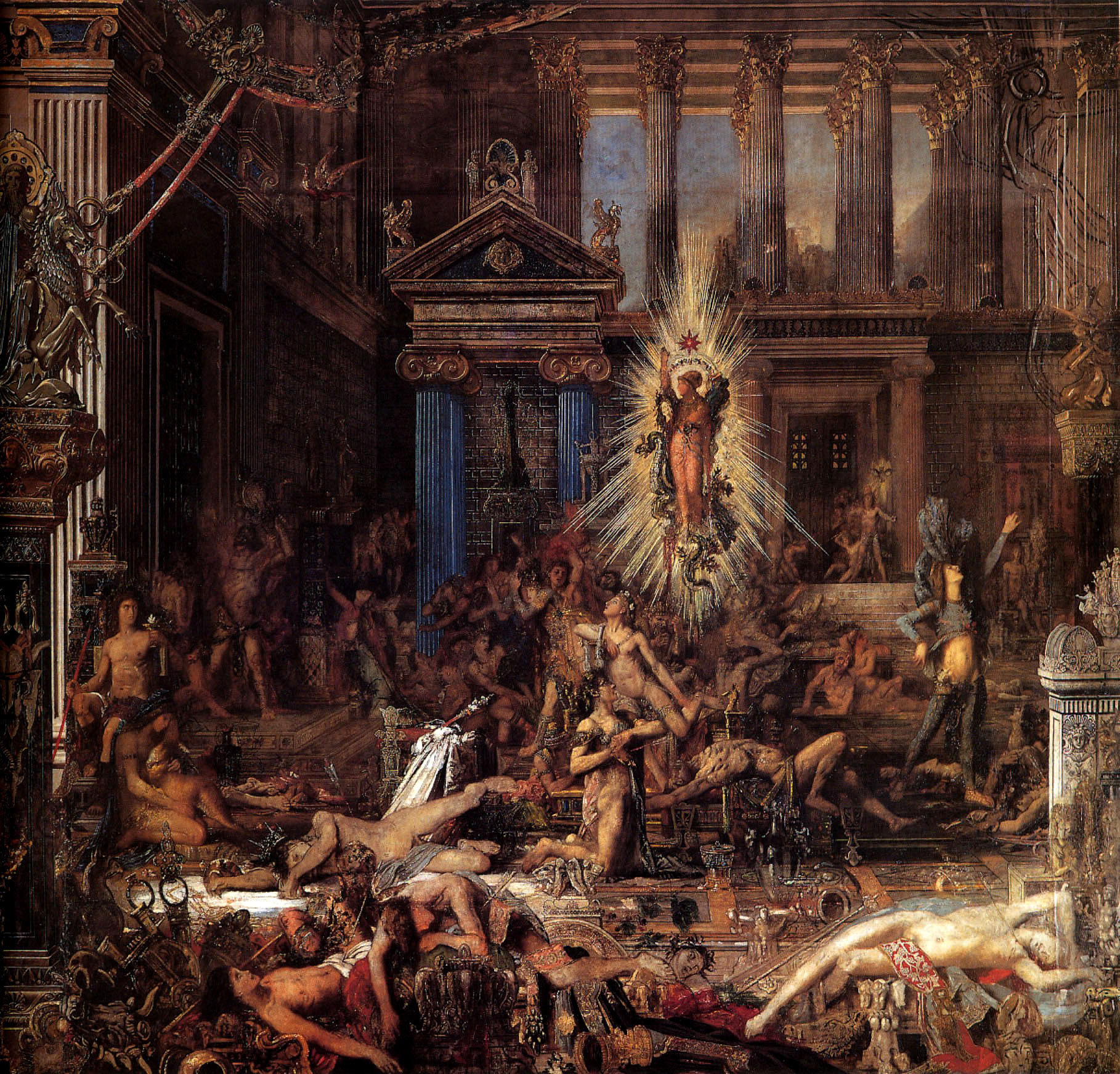
The Suitors [unfinished] (1852–1896), 385 x 343 cm., Musée Gustave Moreau

Moreau spent his time copying paintings in the Louvre and was soon drawn to romanticism. Two contemporary artists he greatly admired were Eugène Delacroix and Théodore Chassériau, both of whom lived and worked in his neighborhood. Chassériau had entered the private studio of the great Neoclassical painter Jean-Auguste-Dominique Ingres at the age of ten and later spent time with Ingres at the French Academy in Rome, but in his late teens he turned away from Neoclassicism to Delacroix and romanticism. Chassériau never attended the École des Beaux-Arts, but he was driven and hardworking and managed to establish a reputation for himself, securing commissions, and living a rather bohemian and sometimes turbulent life. Moreau developed a friendship with Chassériau, seven years his senior, and rented a studio near Chassériau's. He soon followed suit, becoming something of a dapper man about town during this period, attending the opera and theater, and even singing at the social gatherings he frequented. Anecdotal accounts say Moreau visited Delacroix's studio around 1850; he was 28 years older than Moreau, but there is little evidence of a relationship beyond that.

Moreau's father bought a townhome at 14 rue de la Rochefoucauld in 1853, converting the top floor into a studio for Moreau, where he and his parents lived for the rest of their lives. Shortly before moving in, Moreau had started an ambitious canvas, "a scene of epic slaughter" based on an episode from the Odyssey, titled The Suitors (1852–1896). He worked on the painting on and off for the rest of his life, even adding strips of canvas to enlarge the work to a monumental 3.85 x 3.43 meters, but it was still unfinished at the time of his death. Moreau began exhibiting his work with some regularity in the 1850s. He secured some commissions from the city for paintings with the help of his father. He participated in the Paris Salon for the first time in 1852, presenting a Pieta which was purchased by the state for 600 francs. In the Salon of 1853 he exhibited Darius Fleeing after the Battle of Arbela and The Song of Songs, both showing some influence of Chassériau, and the latter bought by the state for 2,000 francs for the Dijon Museum. There was no Salon in 1854, although he received a commission from the state in 1854 for Athenians being Delivered to the Minotaur in the Cretan Labyrinth which was shown at the 1855 Paris World's Fair and purchased for 4,000 francs for the Bourg-en-Bresse Museum. After a few short weeks of declining health in 1856, Chassériau died at the age of 37. On 10 October 1856, Delacroix noted in his journal "Funeral procession of poor Chassériau. I saw Dauzats, Diaz, and the young Moreau. I quite like him" Moreau started work on The Young Man and Death in 1856, finished in 1865 and dedicated to Chassériau.

=== Early work ===
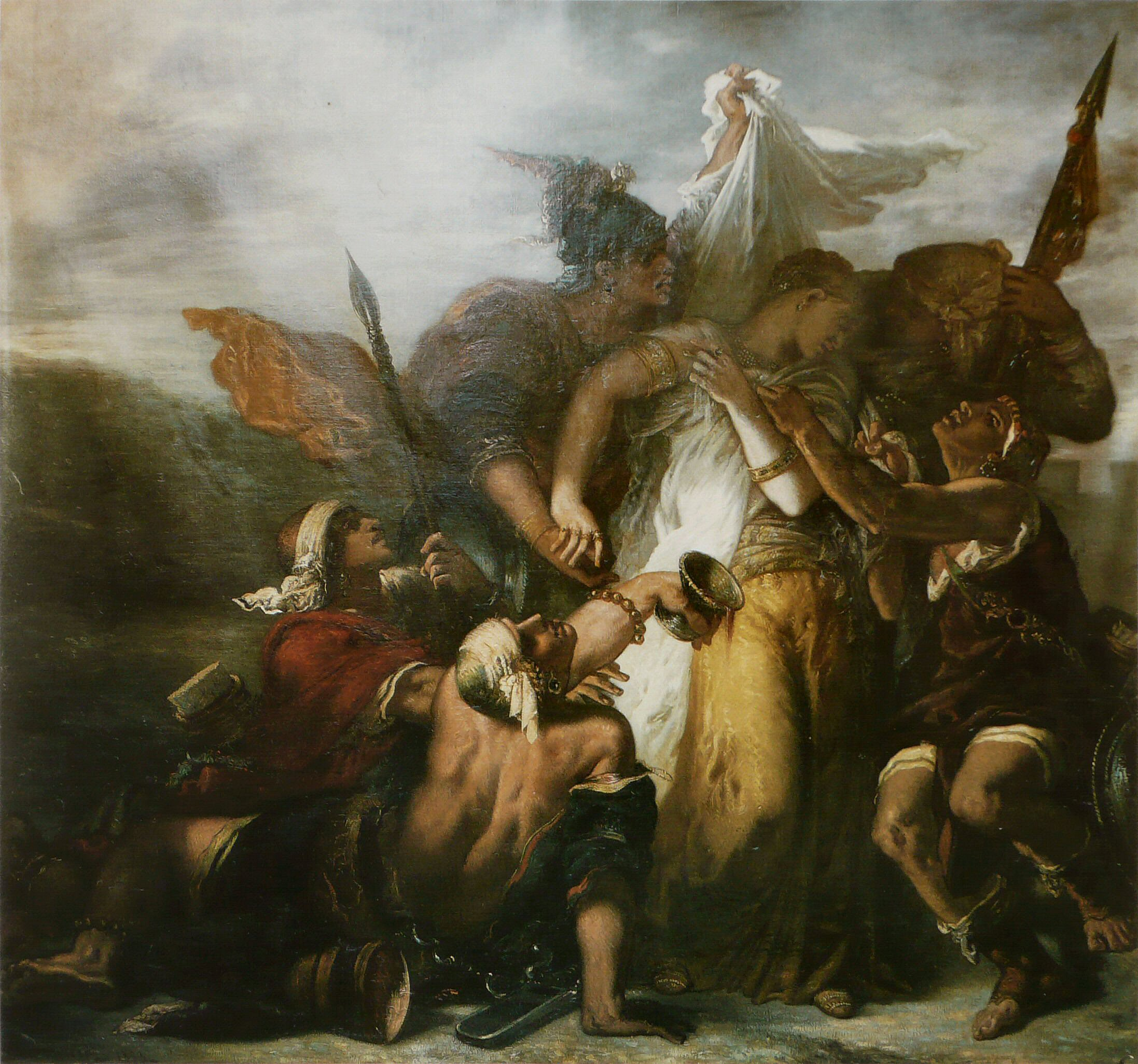
The Song of Songs (1853), 300 × 319 cm., Musée des Beaux-Arts de Dijon

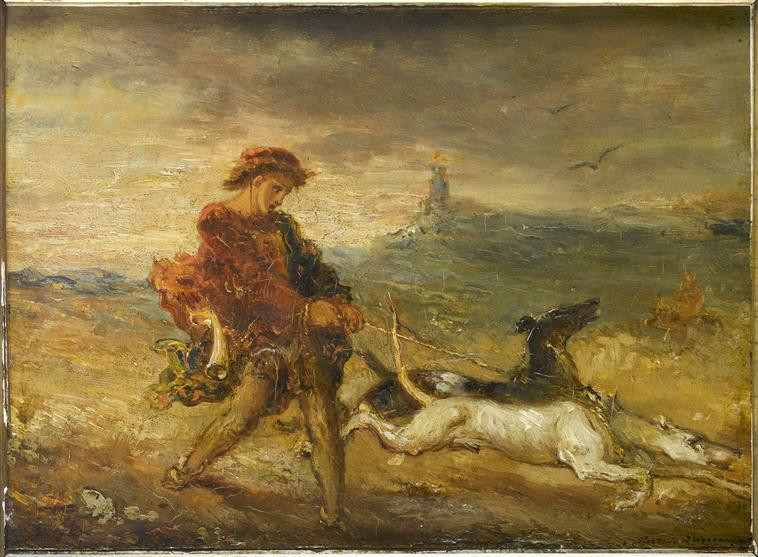
Dog Handler (1854), 32 x 25 cm., private collection

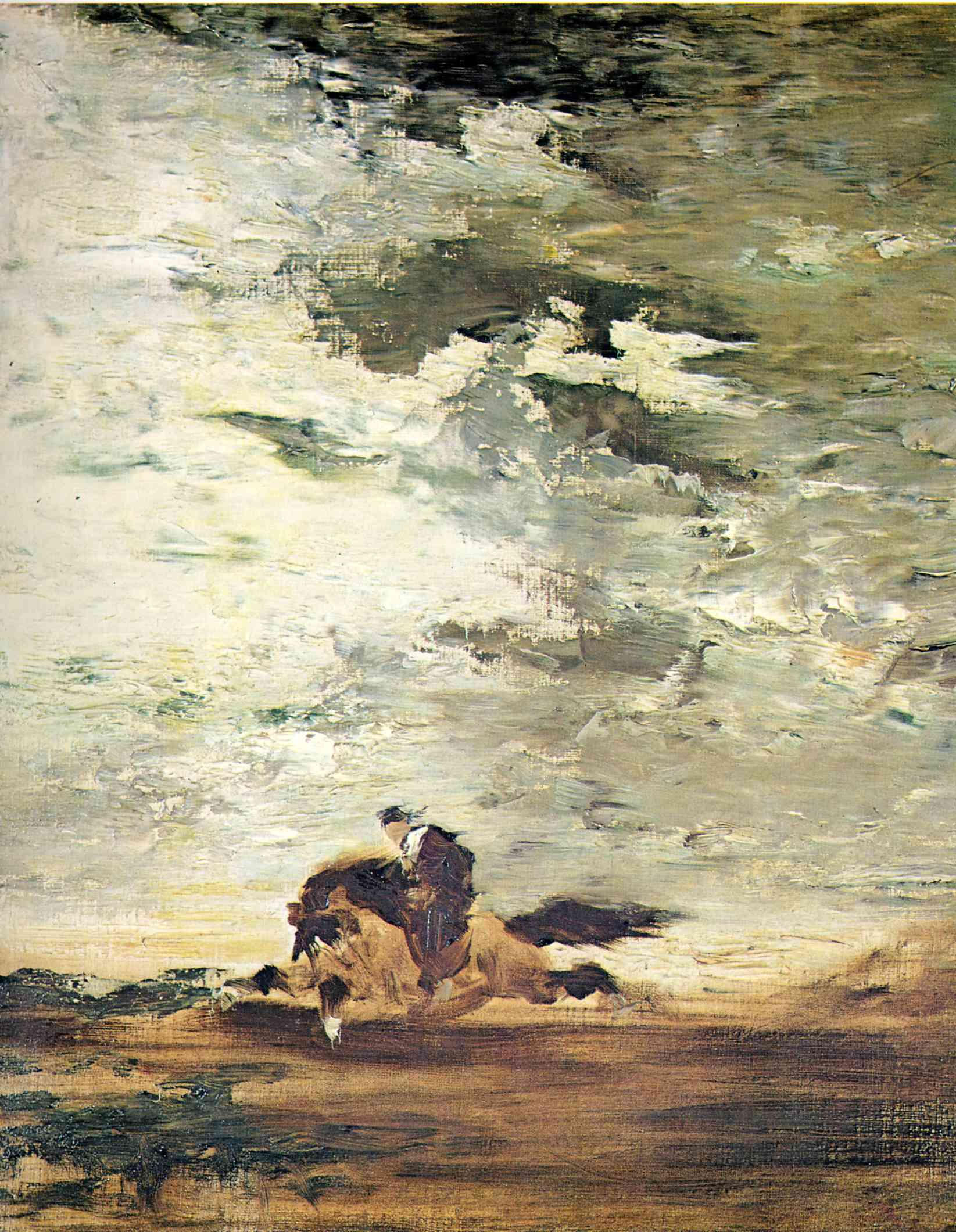
Scottish Horseman (ca. 1854), 145 x 145 cm., Musée Gustave Moreau

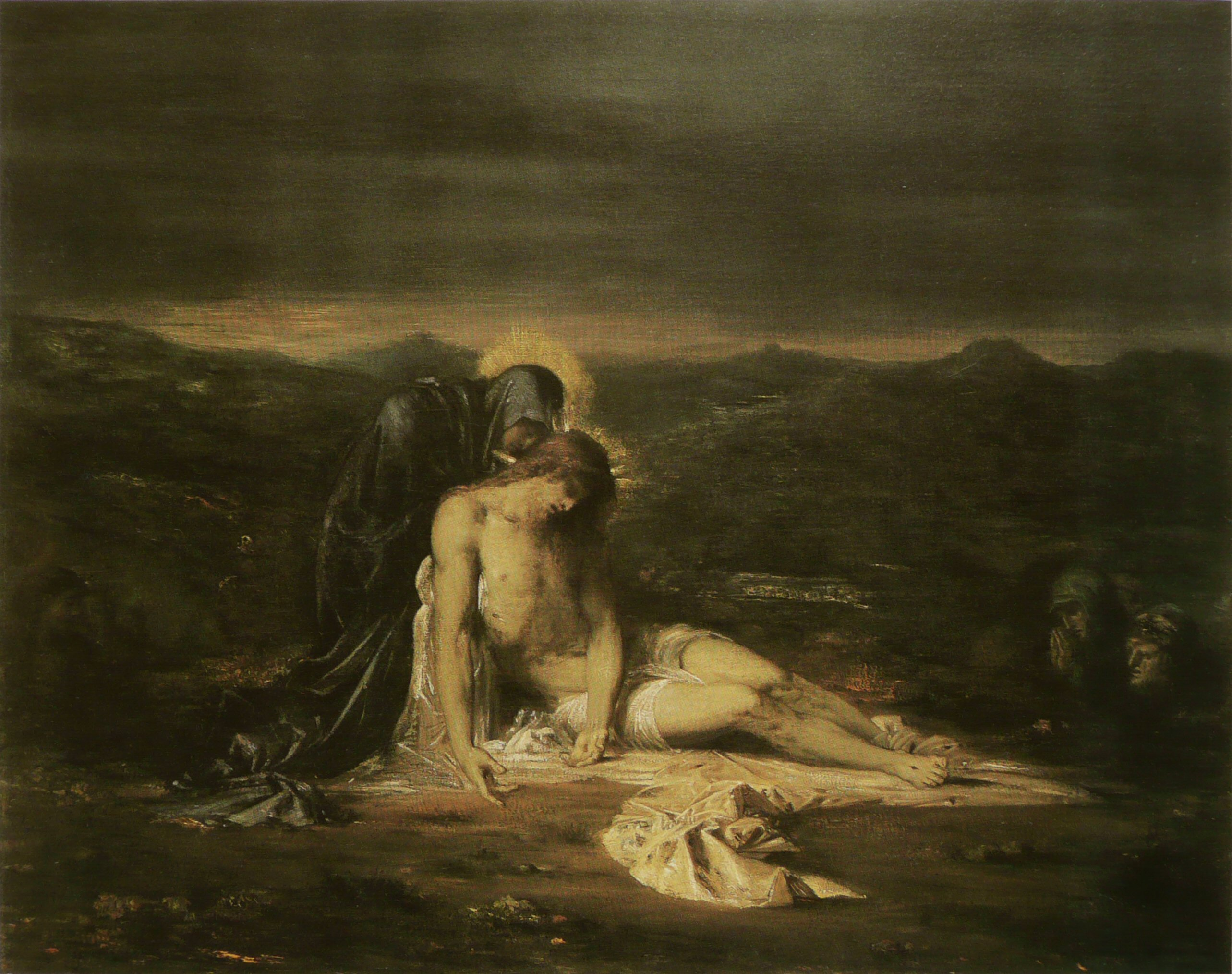
Pietà (1854), 75 x 96 cm., private collection

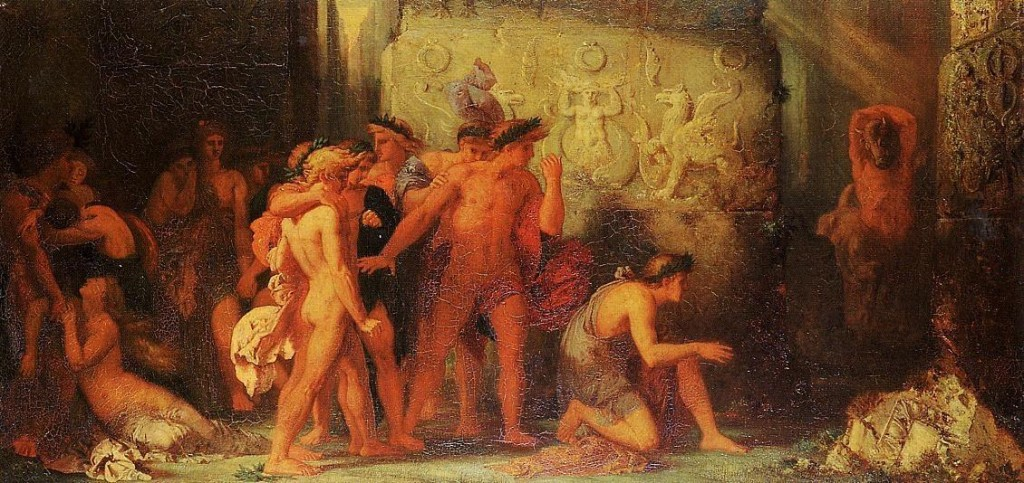
Athenians being Delivered to the Minotaur in the Cretan Labyrinth (1855), 102.5 x: 200 cm., Musée municipal de Bourg-en-Bresse

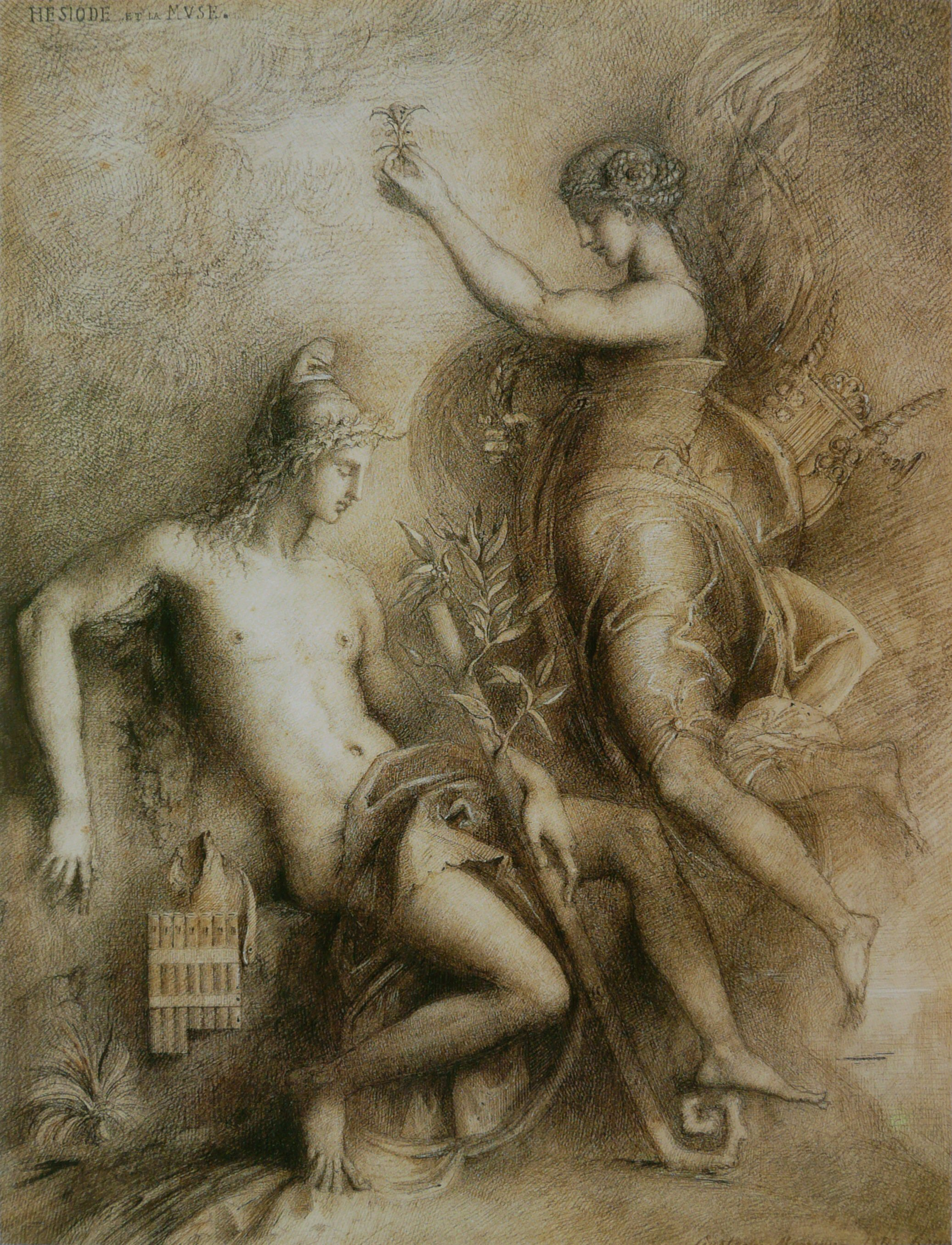
Hesiod and the Muse (1857), 42 x 33 cm., chalk, pen, and ink, Fogg Museum

=== Italy (1857–1859) ===
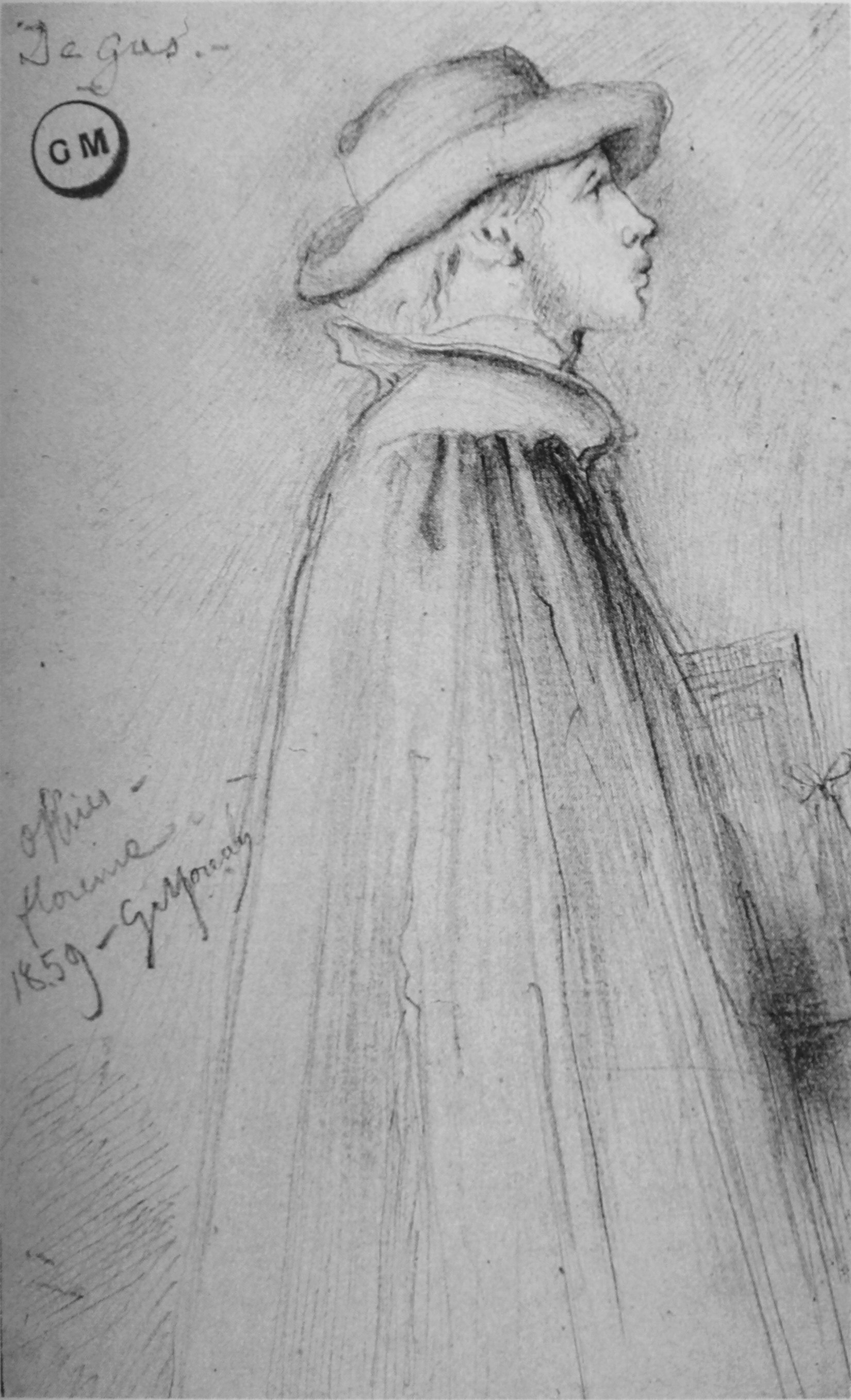
Degas at the Uffizi (1859), pencil, 15.3 x 9.4 cm., Musée Moreau

The death of Chasseriau in 1856 caused Moreau in his grief to withdraw from public life. Concerned about his condition, Moreau's parents suggested he travel to Italy again. Living in Italy, he found a renewed love for art. He gained inspiration from the artists of the Italian Renaissance, such as Leonardo da Vinci and Michelangelo.

Moreau left Paris in October 1857 with his friend, artist Frédéric Charlot de Courcy, sailing from Marseille to Civitavecchia and on to Rome. He approached his time in Italy as a period of extended study, a compensation for his premature withdraw from the École des Beaux-Arts in Paris of sorts. After a few days of getting oriented and taking in the sights he began studying and copying art in the city in earnest. He spent the better part of two months in the Sistine Chapel copying figures from the ceiling seven or eight hours a day. He copied the work of relatively obscure and unknown artists as often as the established masters. He was particularly interested in examining complex grouping of multiple figures and compositional color schemes. He frequented the Villa Medici, where he could work from live models, and there he established friendships with other Parisians studying in Italy, including Elie Delaunay, Henri Chapu, Émile Lévy, and Georges Bizet. He met a young Edgar Degas, for whom Moreau was to become something of a mentor while in Italy. In August 1858 he was joined by his parents. His father, having recently retired, was particularly interested in the architecture. In Venice he developed a fascination with Vittore Carpaccio, a little known artist at that time, and copied several of his works. Visits were made to Florence, Milan, Pisa, and Siena.

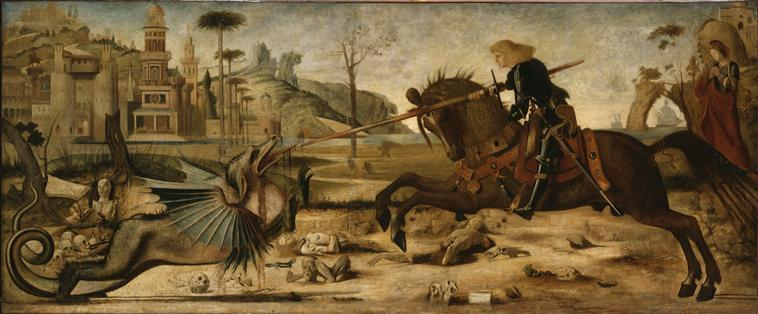
Saint George and the Dragon, after Carpaccio (1858), 140 x 358 cm., Musée Gustave Moreau

The Second Italian War of Independence broke out in the spring of 1859, making the summer in Naples and Pompeii a tense period. Moreau largely copied the work of others in Italy, and produced only a few original works there. Examples include some large drawings on the theme of Hesiod and the Muse and a number of fine landscapes in watercolors, painted en plein air. In September 1859 Moreau and his parents returned to Paris with several hundred drawings and paintings. Back in Paris, Degas painted a small portrait of Moreau in 1860, that hung in Moreau's studio for the rest of his life. However, their relationship began to drift as Degas soon fell under the influence of Édouard Manet and impressionism, while Moreau stayed focused on history painting. Moreau once remarked to Degas "You pretend to be able to renew art through ballet?" to which Degas replied "And you think you will be able to do it by jewelry?"

=== Salon success and mid career (1860–1880) ===
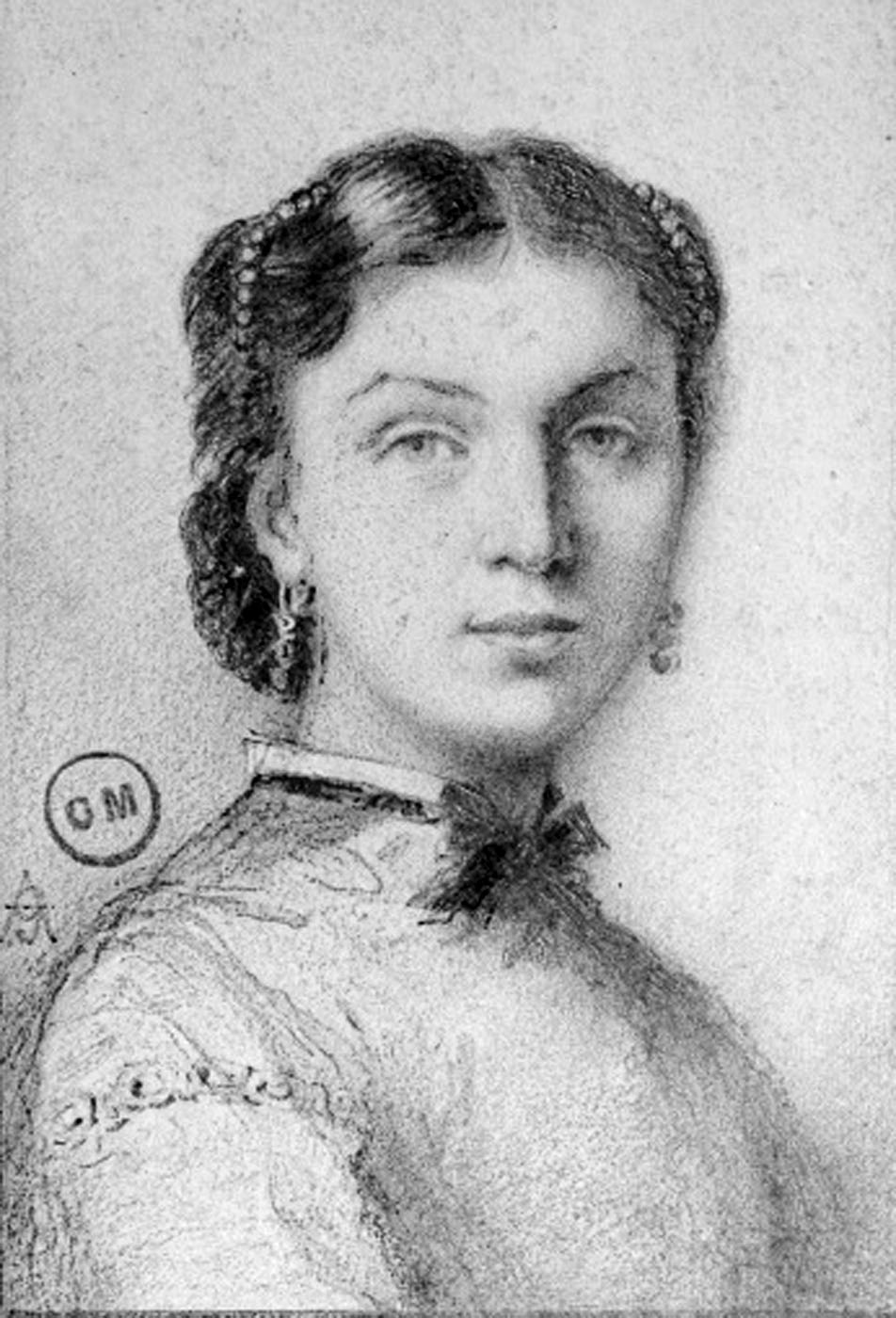
Alexandrine Dureux. by Jules-Élie Delaunay (c. 1865), graphite, 16.1 x 12.5 cm., Gustave Moreau Museum

Moreau never married and very little information is known about his personal and romantic relationships. In the past some biographers speculated that he was gay, largely inferred from the fact that he was a bachelor, a lack of information regarding women in his life, and the sometimes effeminate or androgynous appearance of male figures in some of his paintings. However, more recent research and documents revealed a relationship with Adelaide-Alexandrine Dureux (b. Guise, 8 November 1835 – d. Paris, March 1890) that lasted over 30 years. Moreau apparently met Alexandrine soon after his return from Italy and in following years he produced many drawings and watercolors of her, as well as romantic caricatures of the two of them walking on clouds together. He subsidized an apartment for her on Rue Notre-Dame de Lorette, just a few blocks from the townhome where he lived with his parents. Their relationship was very discreet and known by only a few in his closest circle. His mother was aware of their relationship and apparently fond of her, as indicated by a stipulation in her will that provided an annuity for Alexandrine should Gustave die before her. He designed her tombstone, engraved with their interlaced initials, A and G, which is located near his family plot where he was interred with his parents.

Oedipus and the Sphinx, one of his first Symbolist paintings, won a medal at the Paris Salon of 1864. Its style revealed his close study of the work of Vittore Carpaccio, Mantegna and Giovanni Bellini. Its firm outlines and detailed modeling are typical of the works that brought him success with critics and the public for the remainder of the decade. Moreau quickly gained a reputation for eccentricity. One commentator said Moreau's work was "like a pastiche of Mantegna created by a German student who relaxes from his painting by reading Schopenhauer". The painting currently resides in the permanent collection at the New York Metropolitan Museum of Art.

In the 1870s, disturbed by criticism that his work had become formulaic, he stopped exhibiting for a few years while he concentrated on renewing his art. In 1876 he completed Salome Dancing before Herod, which announced a more painterly style that would characterize his later works.

He was made a Chevalier de la Légion d'honneur in 1875 and was promoted to an Officier de la Légion d'honneur in 1883.

=== Teaching and later career (1881–1898) ===
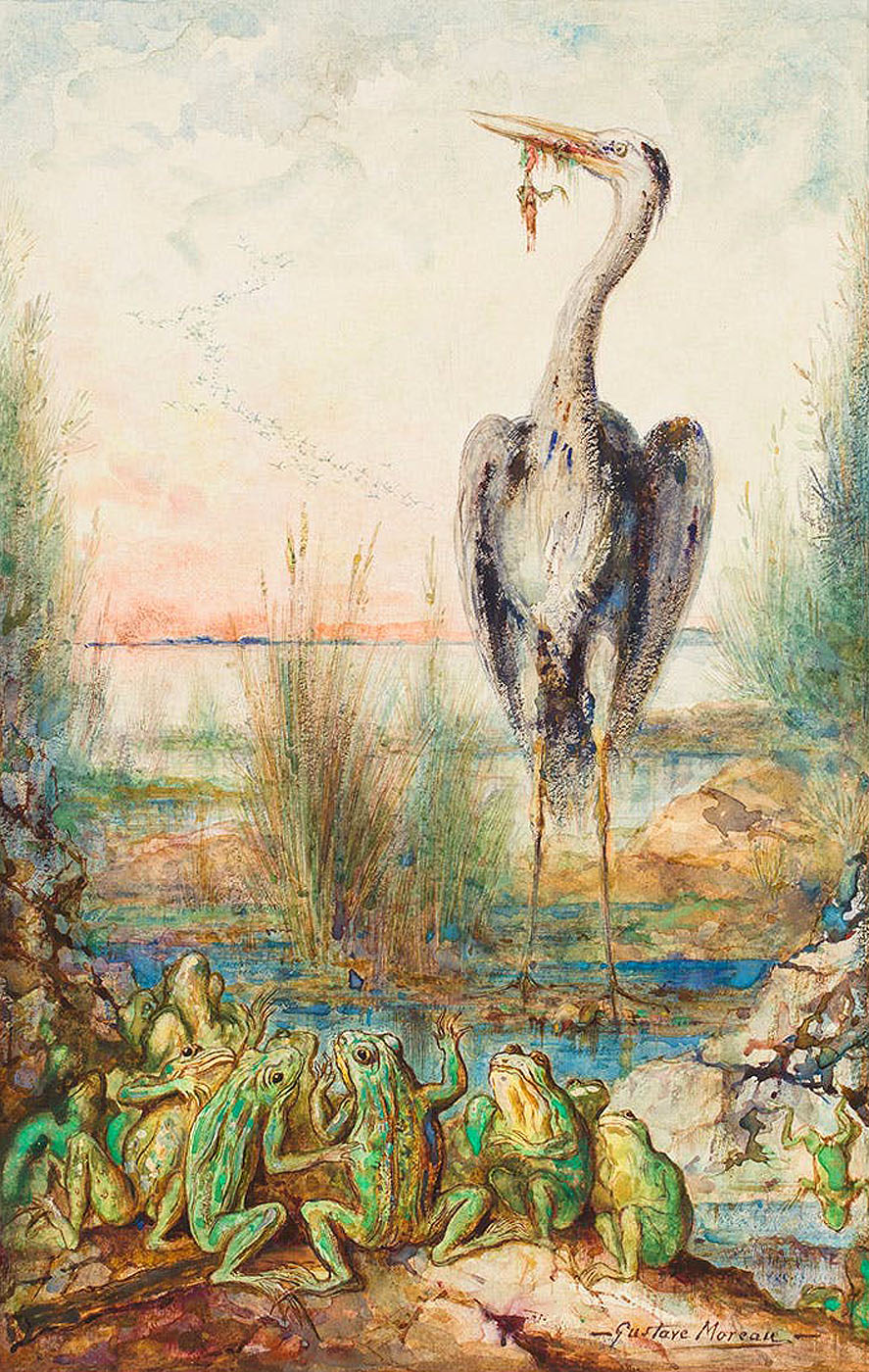
The Frogs Asking for a King, from La Fontaine's Fables (1880s), watercolor, private collection

Moreau increasingly withdrew from society in his later years; he stopped exhibiting at the Salon, and refused to exhibit abroad. However, he continued to produce paintings and sporadically exhibited his work in other venues such as the 1889 Paris World's Fair. He occasionally entertained guests at his townhome and was known for his engaging conversation, but visitors were rarely allowed in his studio to see his work. He was exceptionally cultivated, erudite, and a voracious reader with a personal library of over 1,600 volumes. Compared to other artists who had achieved his level of success in Paris at that time, he lived a fairly modest lifestyle. Edgar Degas, who lived nearby and occasionally still interacted with him, described Moreau in later years as "a hermit who knows what time the trains leave".

Art collector Anthony Roux commissioned several artists to produce works based on Jean de La Fontaine's Fables in 1879, including Moreau, Paul-Jacques-Aimé Baudry, Jules-Élie Delaunay, Gustave Doré, Henri Gervex, Henri Harpignies, Ernest Hébert, Nélie Jacquemart, Eugène Lami, Jean-François Raffaëlli, Félix Ziem, and others. The results were all exhibited together in 1881 at Cercle des Aquarellistes in Paris. The exhibit was celebrated by the critics of the day, and the work of Moreau's (who completed 25 pieces, more than any other) was judged far superior to most of the others. He alone was commissioned to continue the series. In the only private show in his life, 64 La Fontaine fables with six other large watercolors were exhibited at the Goupil & Cie Gallery in 1886, where Thëo Van Gogh was manager, and later in London. The series was exhibited again posthumously in Paris in 1906, and one was donated to the Musée national Gustave Moreau. Remarkably, after Roux's death in 1914, 63 of the watercolors were sold to a single collector, and although regarded as among his finest work, they were not exhibited by the buyer, or their heirs, for well over 100 years, and are known only from some early, low quality black and white reproductions. Nearly half of the paintings later disappeared during the reign of the Nazis and have not resurfaced.

Moreau and his mother were very close throughout his life. She lost her hearing in her later years and Gustave communicated with her by writing notes on slips of paper, often giving his thoughts regarding the paintings he was working on. His assistant Henri Rupp saved many of the notes, which are archived at the museum and provide significant insight into Moreau's ideas on his art. The death of his mother at the age of 82 in 1884 caused him deep despair. For a while he could not spend nights alone in the family townhome and took refuge at the apartment of Alexandrine Dureux nearby. Ultimately, the room where his mother died was left unchanged and became something of a shrine that he never entered. Six years later he was at Alexandrine Dureux's bedside when she died on 28 March 1890 after five months of deteriorating health. Her death also affected him greatly. He bought back several watercolors that he had given her over the years and some furniture from her heirs, which he placed in a room of his townhome in her memory. Both deaths reinforced his isolation and he buried himself in his work, which took on an even greater melancholic edge.

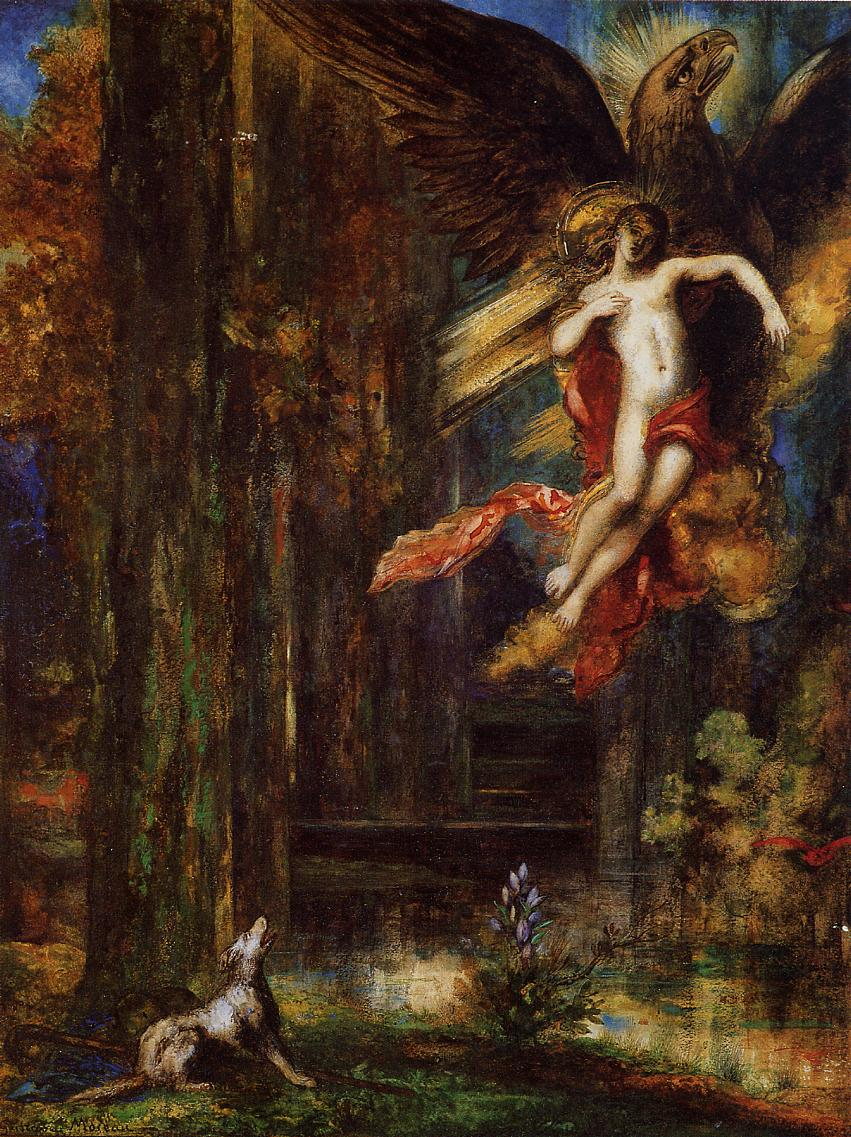
The Abduction of Ganymede (1886), oil on canvas, 58.5 x 45.5 cm, private collection

Moreau was elected into the École des Beaux-Arts in 1888, but he declined professorship and a class, and the director Paul Dubois, exempted him from all formal obligations. However, on his death bed, Élie Delaunay (a close friend since their time in Rome) asked Moreau to succeed him and direct one of the main ateliers at the school. Moreau reluctantly took the class on a temporary basis in October 1891, but later accepted the appointment of professor and atelier director in January 1892 at the age of sixty-five. Moreau was a contrasting individual from the academic artists at the École des Beaux-Arts, including Léon Gërôme, Léon Bonnat, William Bougueruau, Jean-Paul Laurens, Luc-Olivier Merson, and Jules-Eugène Lenepveu. About 125 students passed through Moreau's studio between 1891 and 1898; among them were Pierre Marcel-Béronneau, Simon Bussy, Charles Camoin, Henri Evenepoel, Jules Flandrin, Raoul du Gardier, Jacques Grüber, Charles-François-Prosper Guérin, Henri Matisse, Albert Marquet, Henri Manguin, Edgard Maxence, Theodor Pallady, Léon Printemps, Georges Rouault, and Fernand Sabatté.

"Here, during his last years, he displayed remarkable talents as a teacher." Moreau's class quickly attracted the most progressive and adventurous students. As early as 1896 Roger-Marx wrote, "The fires of insurrection have been lit in the very heart of the École des Beaux-Arts: all the rebels against routine all those who wish to develop in their own individual way, have gathered under the shield of Gustave Moreau." Moreau made no attempt to impose his own views or style on his students. He gave them a stimulating atmosphere and intelligent encouragement to follow their own ideas. He took his pupils to the Louvre to study and copy the masters, unheard of at the École des Beaux-Arts: Matisse said "It was an almost revolutionary attitude on his part to show us the way to the Museum." Students were invited to his home on Sunday afternoons (but not allowed to see his studio), and occasionally he visited his students.

Yesterday at half past one I was walking along the embankment when I met Gustave Moreau, who like myself was on his way to see a good chum of mine, Henri Matisse, a delicate painter, skilful in the art of using grays. He suffers from violent neuralgia in his arm and can hardly walk. Somehow or other we reached the Quai Saint-Michel, where Matisse was strolling about, waiting for him. We made our way painfully up the stairs of that old house at No 19. There we were at last in the small studio full of torn wallpaper and knick-knacks, all gray with dust. Moreau said to me "We are the jury." He sat down in an armchair, with me beside him, and we spent a delightful hour. He told us the whys and the wherefores of his likes and dislikes. Matisse showed us his entries for the Champs de Mars exhibition [i.e. Salon de la Société Nationale des Beaux-Arts], some ten canvases, with beautiful colors, practically all of them still lifes, and they provided the starting point for talk about everything connected with art, including music. Moreau has remained astonishingly young. There is nothing professorial about him, not a hint of pedantry. He is a friend." – Henri Evenepoel

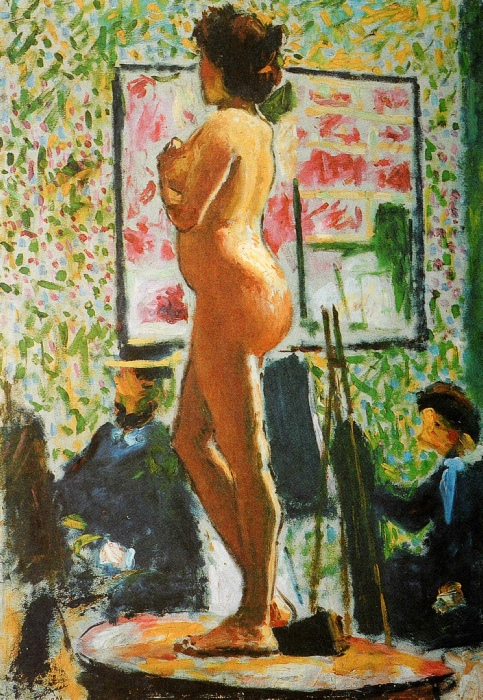
Fauve Nude in Moreau's class at the École des Beaux-Arts by Albert Marquet (1898), oil, 73 × 50 cm; Musée des Arts de Bordeaux

Georges Rouault said, "He was not a professor in the commonly accepted sense, but a man whom it did you good to emulate." Rouault was already a student when Moreau took the class. He soon recognized Rouault's exceptional talent, and Rouault always held Moreau in the highest esteem. "Half a century later Rouault still spoke of him with the same veneration, with the same sympathy and cordiality, as if Moreau were still living, and as if Rouault himself were still a raw youth at the feet of a mentor whose judgments he trusted implicitly both in art and in life. Matisse said, "Gustave Moreau's great quality was to regard the mind of a young student as needing to develop continuously throughout his life, and not to push him to get through the various scholastic examinations." Matisse had been denied admission to the École des Beaux-Arts, but Moreau saw him drawing in the public courtyard of the school and invited him to join his class, exempting him from the entrance examination. Matisse soon became the central figure among a faction of students in Moreau's studio that developed into the fauvist. Albert Marquet said, "As early as 1898, Matisse and I were working in what was later to be called the fauve manner", exemplified by Fauve Nude, painted in Moreau's atelier. For decades his pupils credited the significance of their teacher, recalling his prophetic comments that were often taken to heart: "the more elementary your means are, the more your sensibility shows through."; "One must think color, one must have it in the imagination." "Nature in itself is nothing! It merely gives the artist an occasion to express himself. Art is the unflagging pursuit through plastic means of expression and inner feeling."

Moreau's concerns for the fate of his life's work started in the 1860s. He began an inventory of his paintings about 1884, and the death of Delaunay in 1891 exemplified what could become of an artist's work after their death. Moreau arrived at the idea of leaving his house to the state as a museum, and remodeled his townhome in 1895, expanding his small studio on the top floor into a much larger exhibition space. After about a year of declining health, Moreau died of stomach cancer on 18 April 1898 and was buried at the Cimetière de Montmartre in Paris in his parents' tomb. He left instructions stipulating that his death was not to be announced in the press; his funeral was to be a very small, simple service; and any flowers were to be placed on the grave of Alexandrine Dureux, not his own. The government was hesitant to accept the estate, as artist's house museums were very rare at that time and unprecedented in France. His assistant Henri Rupp was significant in organizing the estate and persuading the state to take it over.

== Art ==
I believe neither in what I touch nor in what I see and only in what I feel. My brain and my reason seem to be ephemeral and of dubious reality. My inner feeling alone appears to me eternal and unquestionably certain. – Gustave Moreau

=== Exoticism ===
Gustave Moreau's education in classical drawing did not stop him from experimenting with different styles of art. By traveling to other countries such as Italy or Holland and reading publications, Moreau was able to develop his unique form of art. The most important publications he owned were The Grammar of Ornament by Owen Jones, Le costume historique by August Racinet, and Le Costume by Frederick Hottenroth. All these influences led Moreau to draw not only humans, but animals and architectural monuments. He started his career drawing classical art, but by incorporating exotic images he developed a mysterious and unique form of art.

== Legacy ==
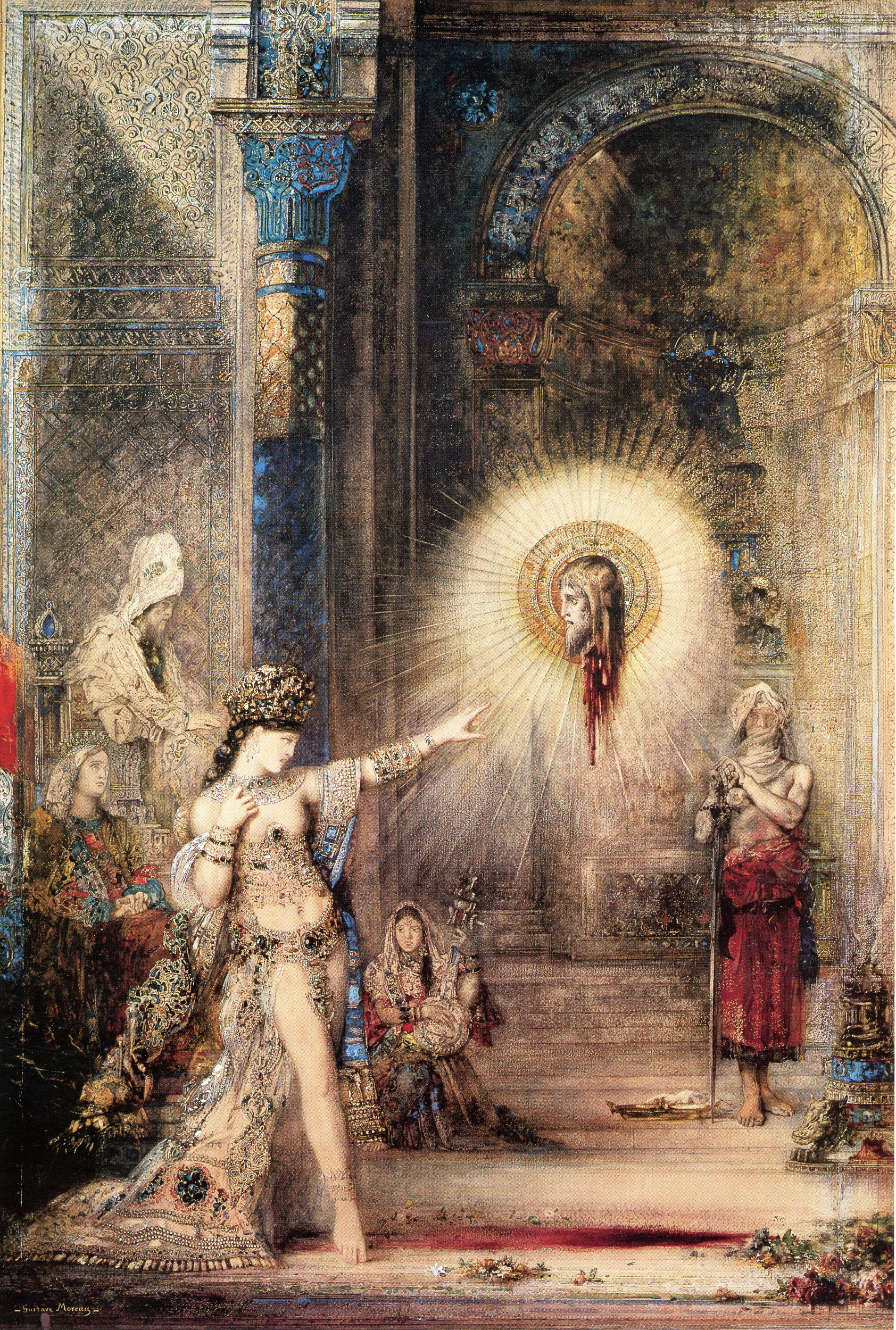
L'Apparition (1876), watercolor, 105 x 72 cm., Musée d'Orsay

During his lifetime, Moreau produced more than 15,000 paintings, watercolors and drawings. Due to his reluctance to sell his work, when he died he still owned 1,200 paintings and watercolors and 10,000 drawings which he left to the state. The Musée national Gustave Moreau at 14 rue de la Rochefoucauld (9th arrondissement), opened to the public on 14 January 1903, with his former student Georges Rouault appointed curator.

"A visionary like none other, he made the land of dreams his own, but from the madness of his dreams a sense of anguish and despair found its way into his works. A master sorcerer, he cast a spell over his period, enthralled his contemporaries, and brought a tinge of idealism to the skeptical and practical fin-de siècle. Under the influence of his painting, a whole generation of young men have grown up doleful and languid, their eyes obstinately turned to the past and the magic of other days; a whole generation of men of letters, especially poets, have become nostalgically enamored of slender Salomes glittering with jewels, of Muses carrying blood drained severed heads." – Jean Lorrain

His influence on symbolism in his lifetime and the decade following his death was tremendous. "Gustave Moreau was the man of the moment. Aloof, independent, solitary, he yet became fashionable in high society and was taken up in masonic and occult circles." Art historian Jean Selz wrote "He was a symbolist before the Symbolist and the most extraordinary of all of them." He influenced the next generation of Symbolists, particularly leading figures in Belgian Symbolism such as Jean Delville and Fernand Khnopff, and Odilon Redon in France. Redon said of his work "Moreau, a bachelor, produced the work of an elegant bachelor, strictly sealed up against the shocks of life; his work is the fruit of it, it is art and nothing but art, and that is a saying a good deal."

Many poets and writers of the day revered Moreau's paintings, Théophile Gautier, Joris-Karl Huysmans, Stéphane Mallarmé, Paul de Saint-Victor, and Emile Zola all praised his work. It was a common practice at the time for poets to paraphrase in verse paintings they admired, and the paintings of Gustave Moreau were among the most lauded of the symbolist poets. Théodore de Banville, José Maria de Heredia, Claudius Popelin, Jean Lorrain, Henri Cazalis, and others wrote of Moreau's work in poetry.

Interest in his work remained fairly high in the first decade of the 20th century and occasional exhibitions of his paintings were held in the 15 years following his death. However, when the museum opened there was some disappointment in the audiences of the time in seeing the large numbers of drawings and unfinished paintings, and not a museum full of highly finished masterworks in oils, and attendance began to drop off after the opening. With the rise and prevalence of realism, impressionism and postimpressionism, followed by the onslaught of fauvism, cubism, futurism, expressionism, abstract art, and dada, Moreau (and most symbolist painting not realized in an expressionist style), appeared less relevant to modernism and was all but forgotten. After World War I, what little fame and notoriety Moreau had was largely related on his status as the teacher of Rouault and Matisse and the Fauvist. One of the only exhibitions in the 40-year period between 1918 and 1958 was a show held in Paris in 1926 centered around Moreau and his pupils.

=== Moreau and surrealism ===
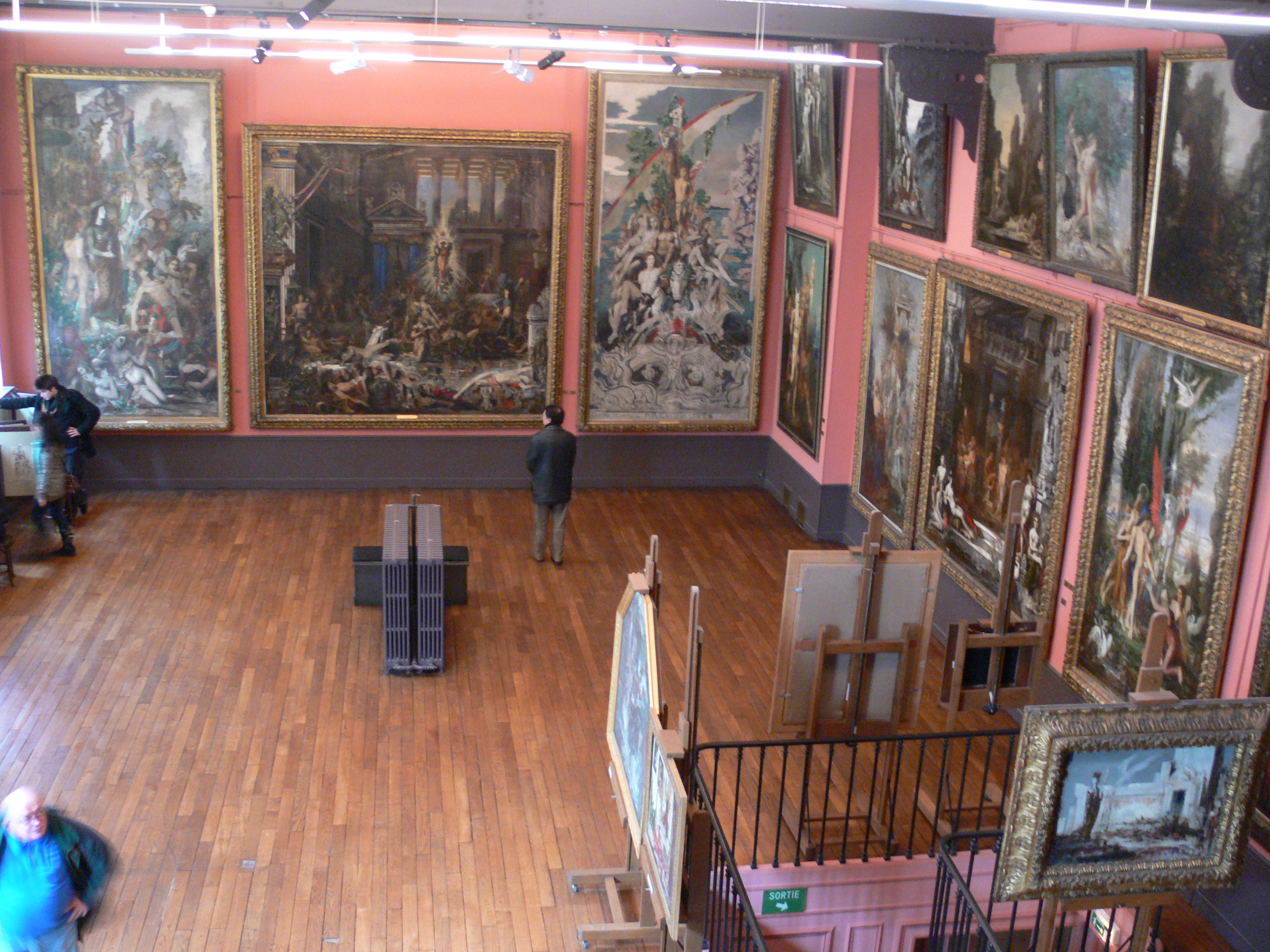
The upper level of the Musée national Gustave-Moreau, once Moreau's home and studio. It was converted into a museum shortly before the artist's death.

André Breton famously used to "haunt" the museum and regarded Moreau as a precursor of Surrealism. In his Manifesto of Surrealism, he listed forerunners of the movement, poets and painters who "could pass for Surrealist", and included Moreau with Picasso, de Chirico, and a short list of other examples. Breton wrote in 1961: "My discovery of the Gustave Moreau Museum in Paris when I was sixteen years old shaped my likes and loves for the rest of my life. It was there, in certain women's faces and figures, that I had the revelation of beauty and love." Georges Bataille wrote enthusiastically of his work, calling him a precursor of surrealism. Salvador Dalí was also a great admirer of Moreau's work and a regular visitor to the Gustave Moreau Museum: "To those I love, I recommend visiting the Museum, going and plunging into this twilight world where, risen from the gulf of erotic and scatological obsession, constellations of precious stones float like so many promises of archangelical redemption." It was at the Gustave Moreau Museum in 1970 that Dalí (holding a wax replica of his own head on a silver platter) chose to make the public announcement of his plans to open his own museum, Teatro-Museo Dalí, in Figueras, Spain. Max Ernst is known to have used reproductions of Moreau's work on occasion to create collages.

Andre Breton advocated for Moreau's work throughout his life, whenever he had the opportunity, in his writings, and introduced other writers and artists to the museum in Paris. At a time when Moreau and symbolism had largely drifted into obscurity, Breton sponsored an exhibition of symbolist drawings in Paris, at the Dateau-Lavoir Gallery in 1958. The exhibit has been identified as a significant event in re-establishing recognition of Moreau's work. It was a small, "over-confidential" exhibition, but it succeeded in getting the attention of the right curators and in 1961, no less than the Louvre Museum and the Museum of Modern Art mounted exhibitions of Moreau's paintings, which in turn were followed by a landmark exhibition of symbolism, Le Groupe des XX et son temps in Brussels in 1962. By the 1970s, exhibitions and monographs on Moreau and symbolism were appearing with some regularity.

The Japanese artist Yoshitaka Amano, known for works such as Final Fantasy, Angel's Egg, and Vampire Hunter D, was inspired by Moreau's style. Amano said in an interview that when he was first experimenting with styles to try to find his own, he would try to mimic the works of Moreau.

== Gallery ==
=== Oil paintings ===
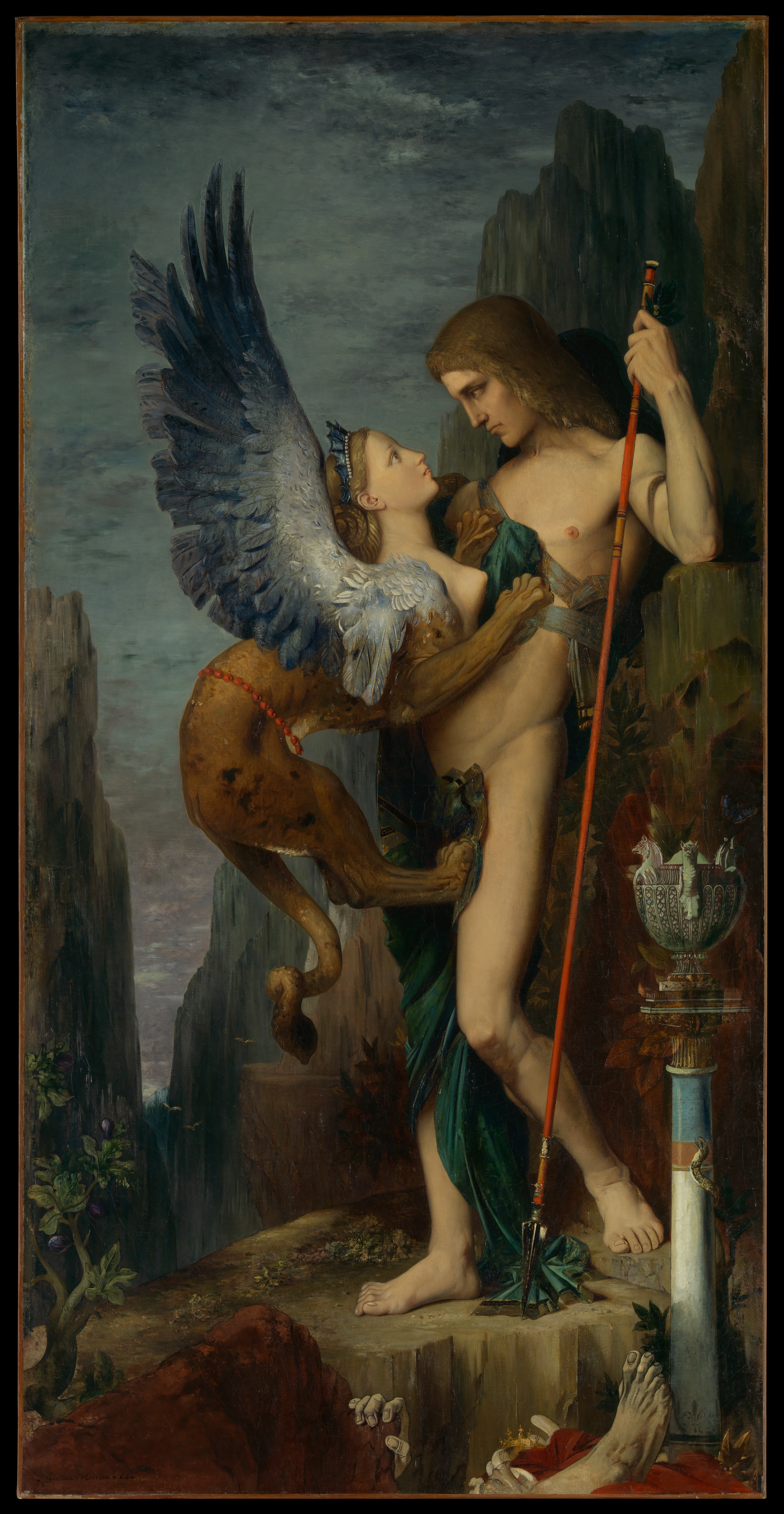
Oedipus and the Sphinx (1864), 206 x 105 cm, Metropolitan Museum of Art

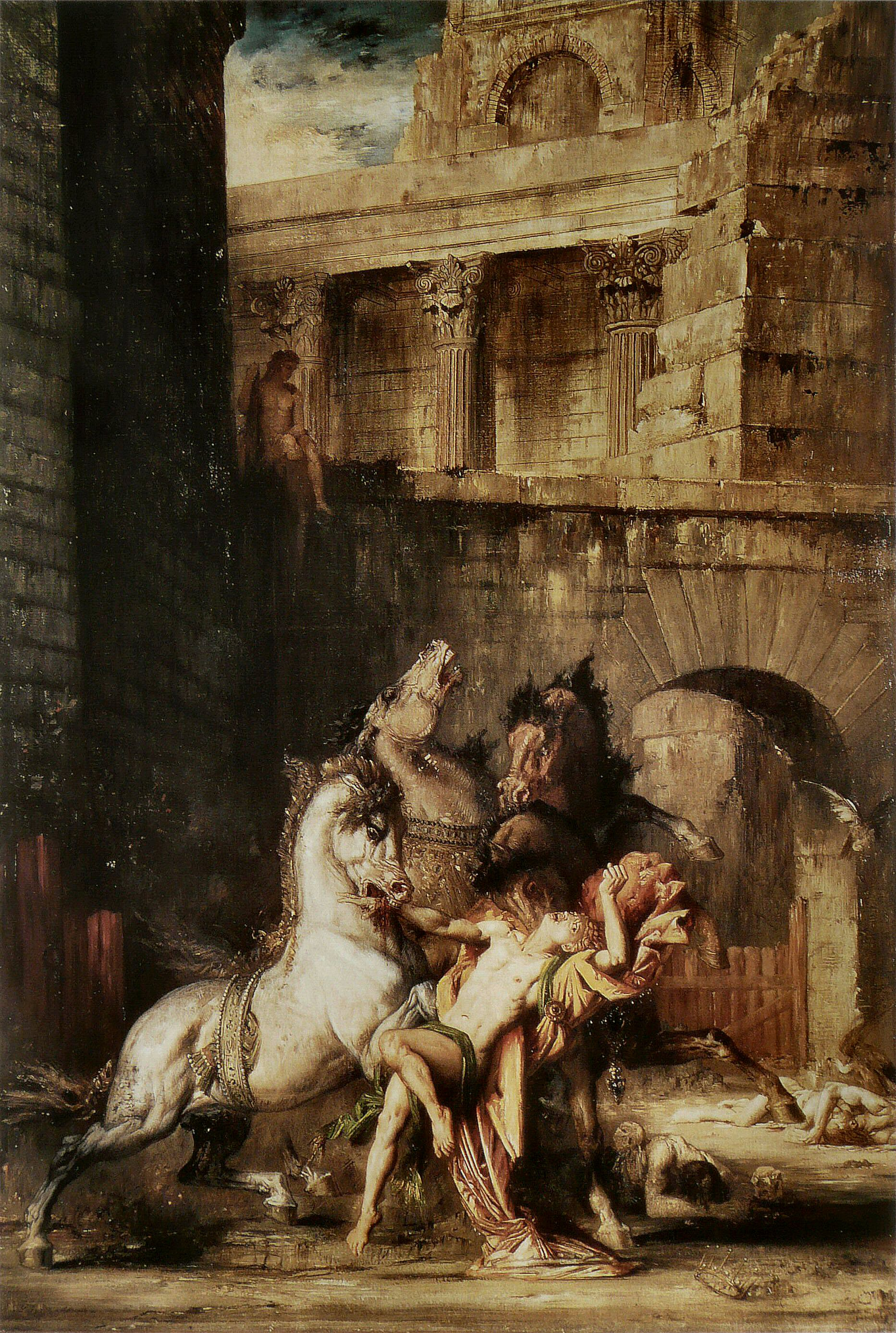
Diomedes Devoured by his Horses (1865), 140 x 95.5 cm, Musée des Beaux-Arts de Rouen

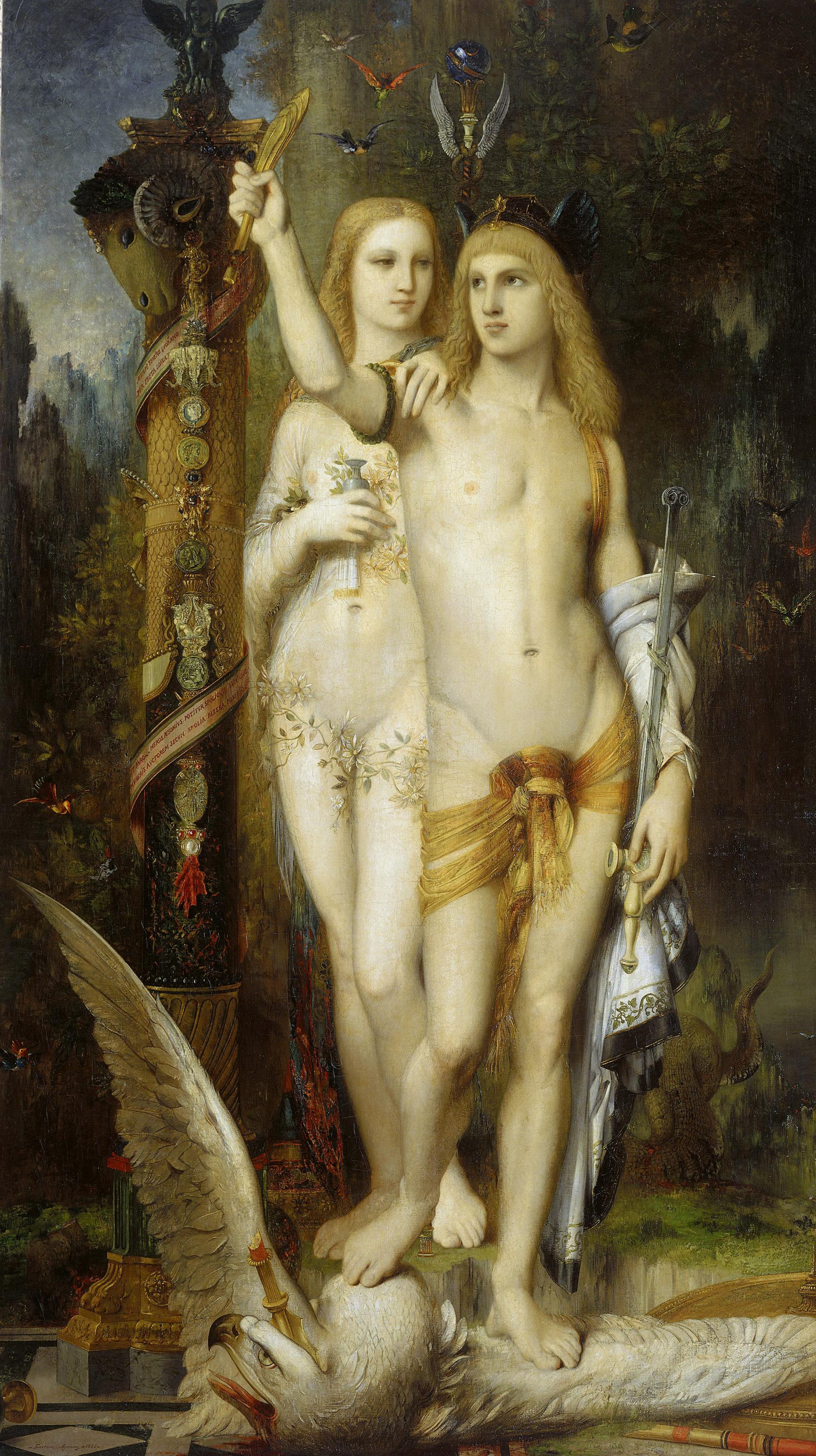
Jason and Medea (1865), 213 x 126 cm, Musée d'Orsay

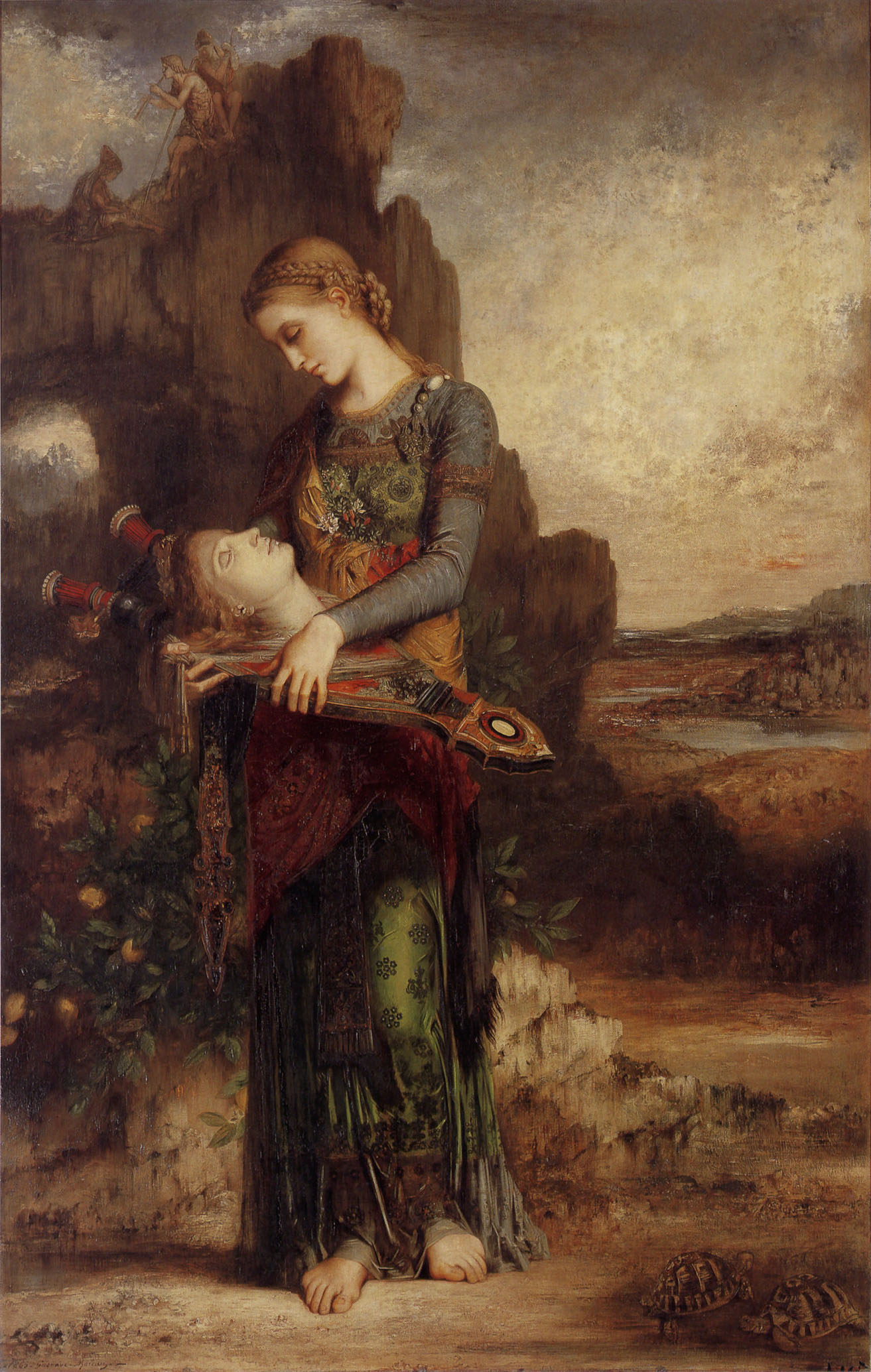
Orpheus (1865), 154 x 99.5 cm, Musée d'Orsay

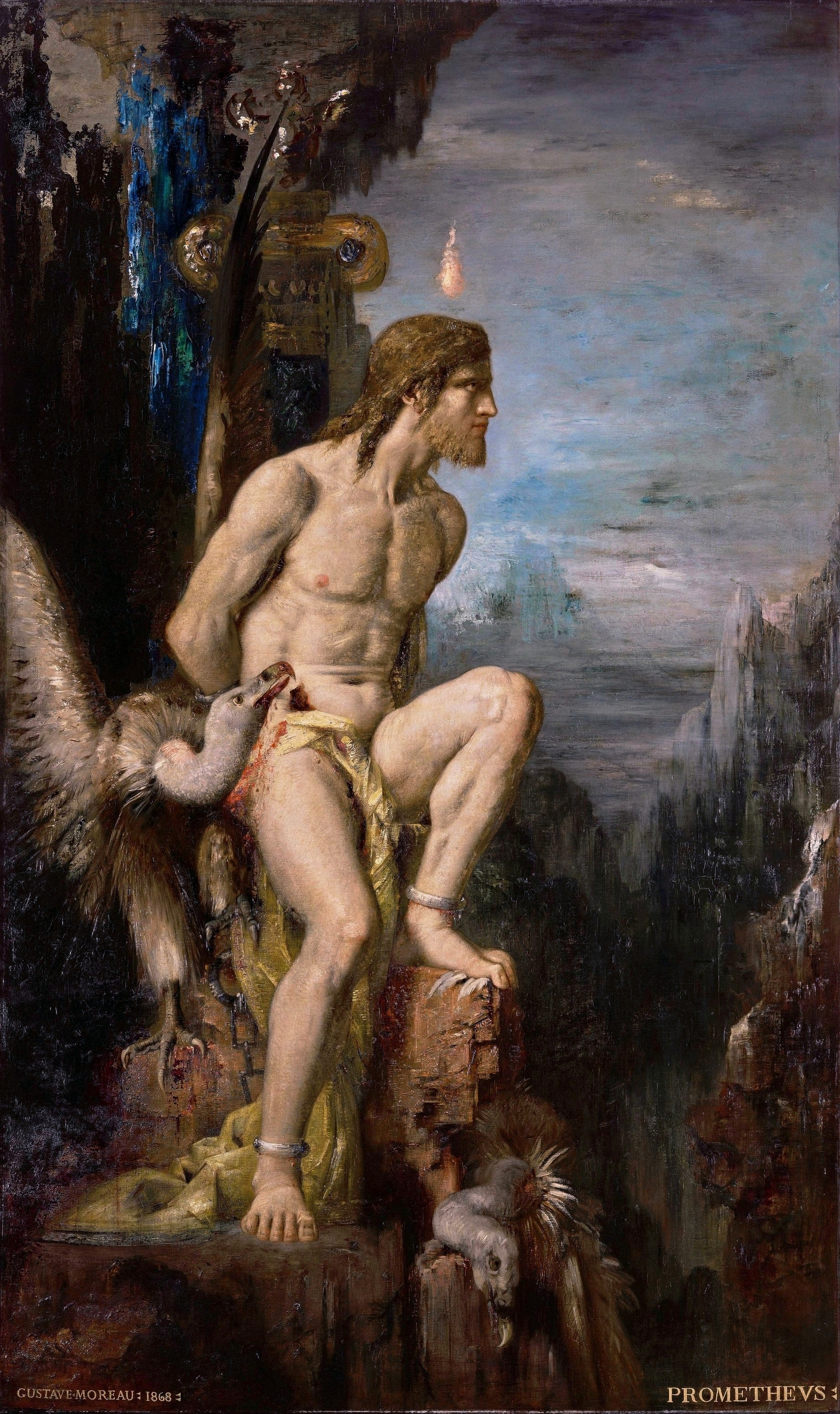
Prometheus (1868), 205 x 122 cm, Musée Gustave Moreau

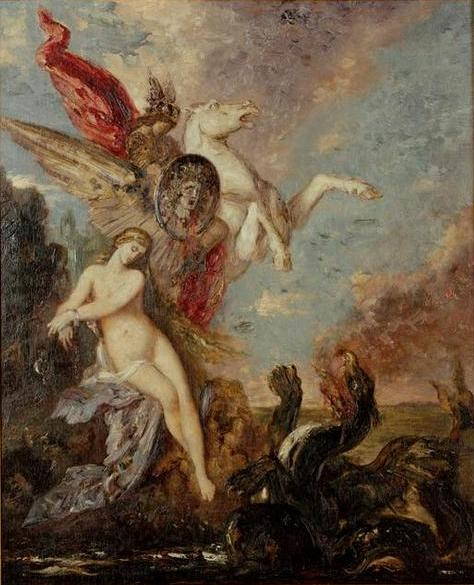
Andromeda (1867–1869), 55 x 43 cm, Musée Gustave Moreau

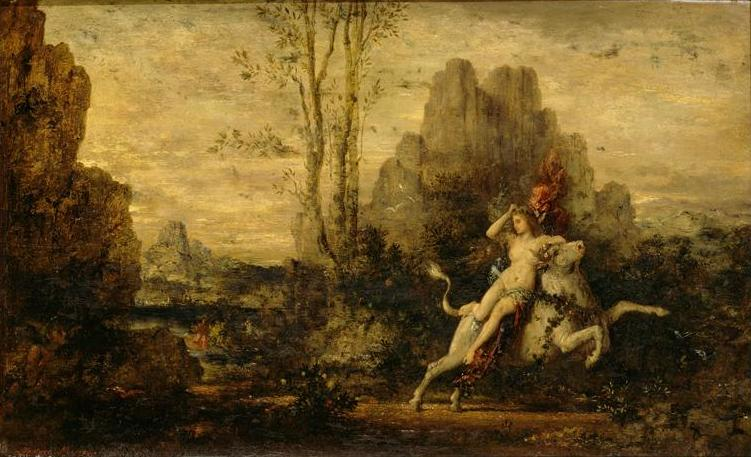
Abduction of Europa (c. 1869), 26 x 42 cm, Musée d'Orsay

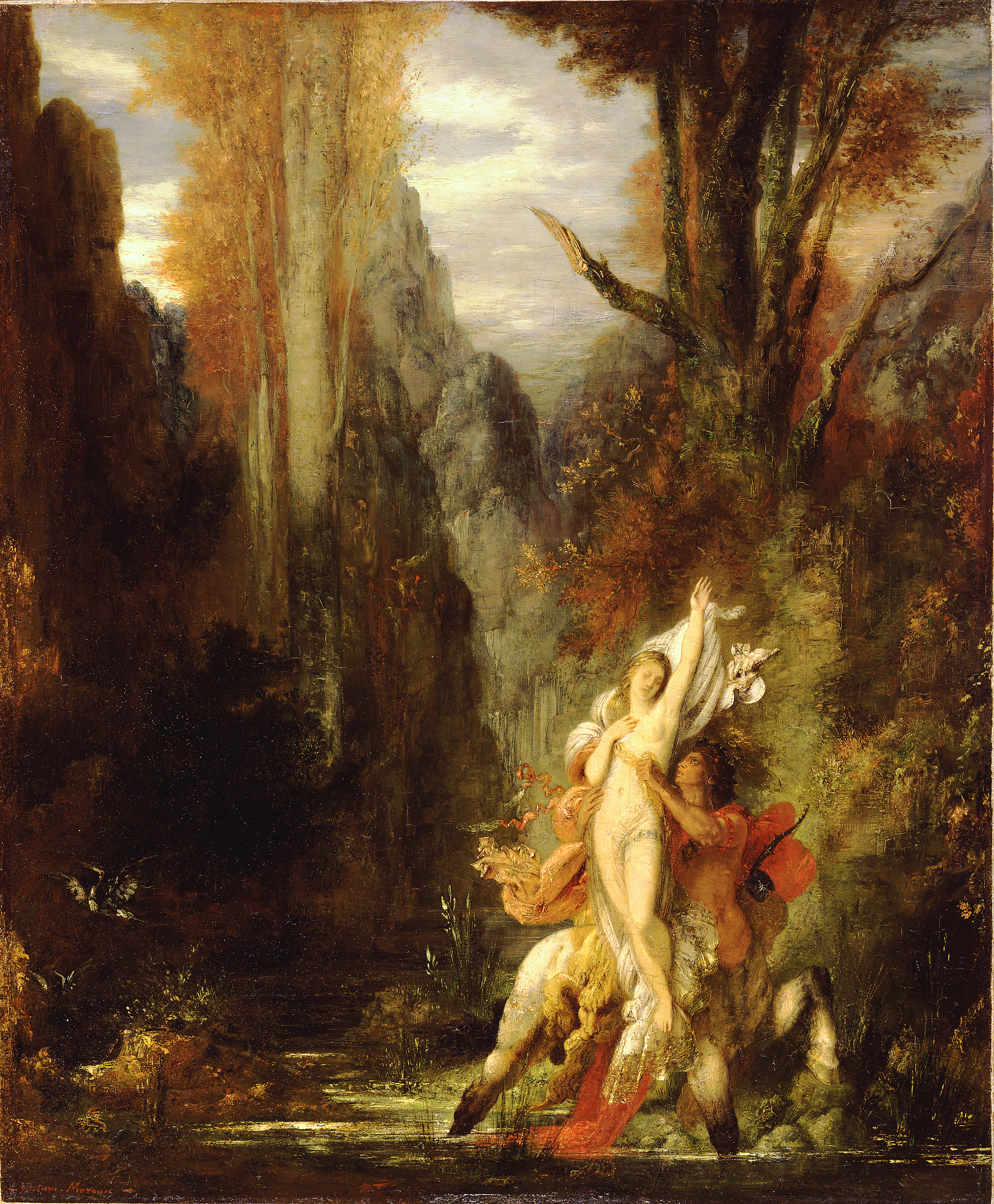
Deianira, Autumn (1872), 55.1 x 45.4 cm, J. Paul Getty Museum

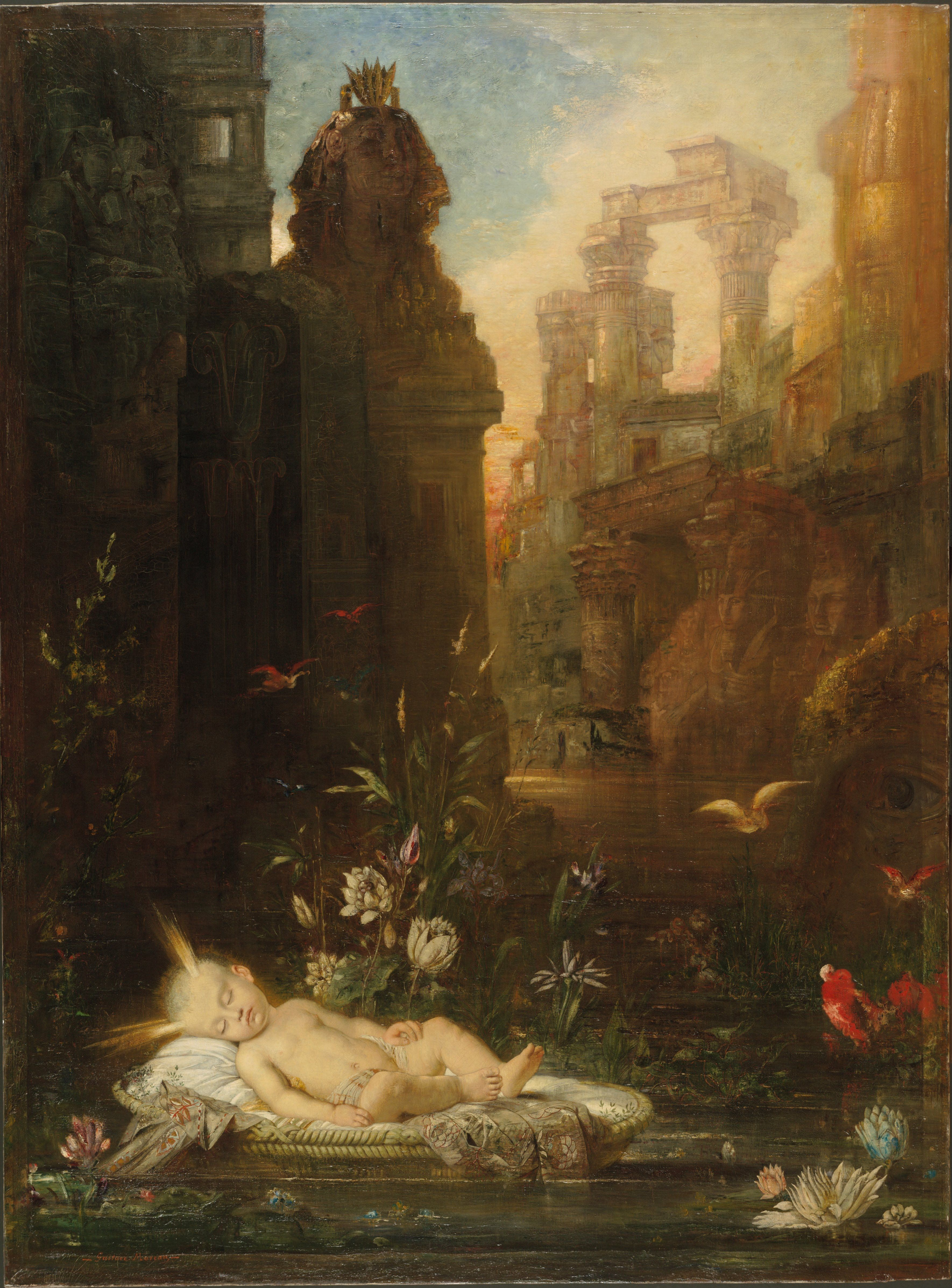
The Infant Moses (c. 1876–78), 185 x 136.2 cm, Fogg Museum

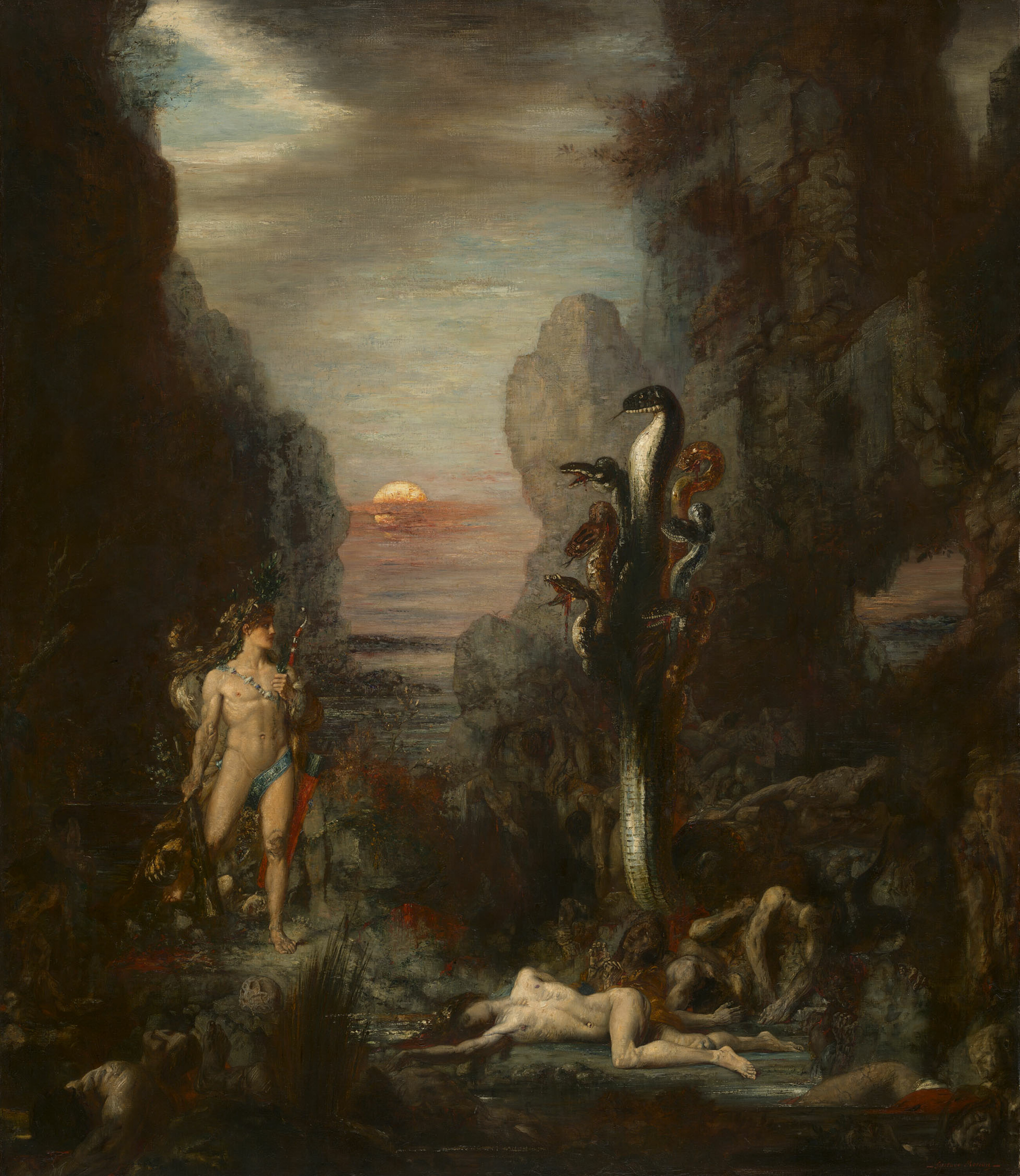
Hercules and the Hydra of Lerna (1876), oil on canvas, 179.3 x 154 cm, Art Institute of Chicago

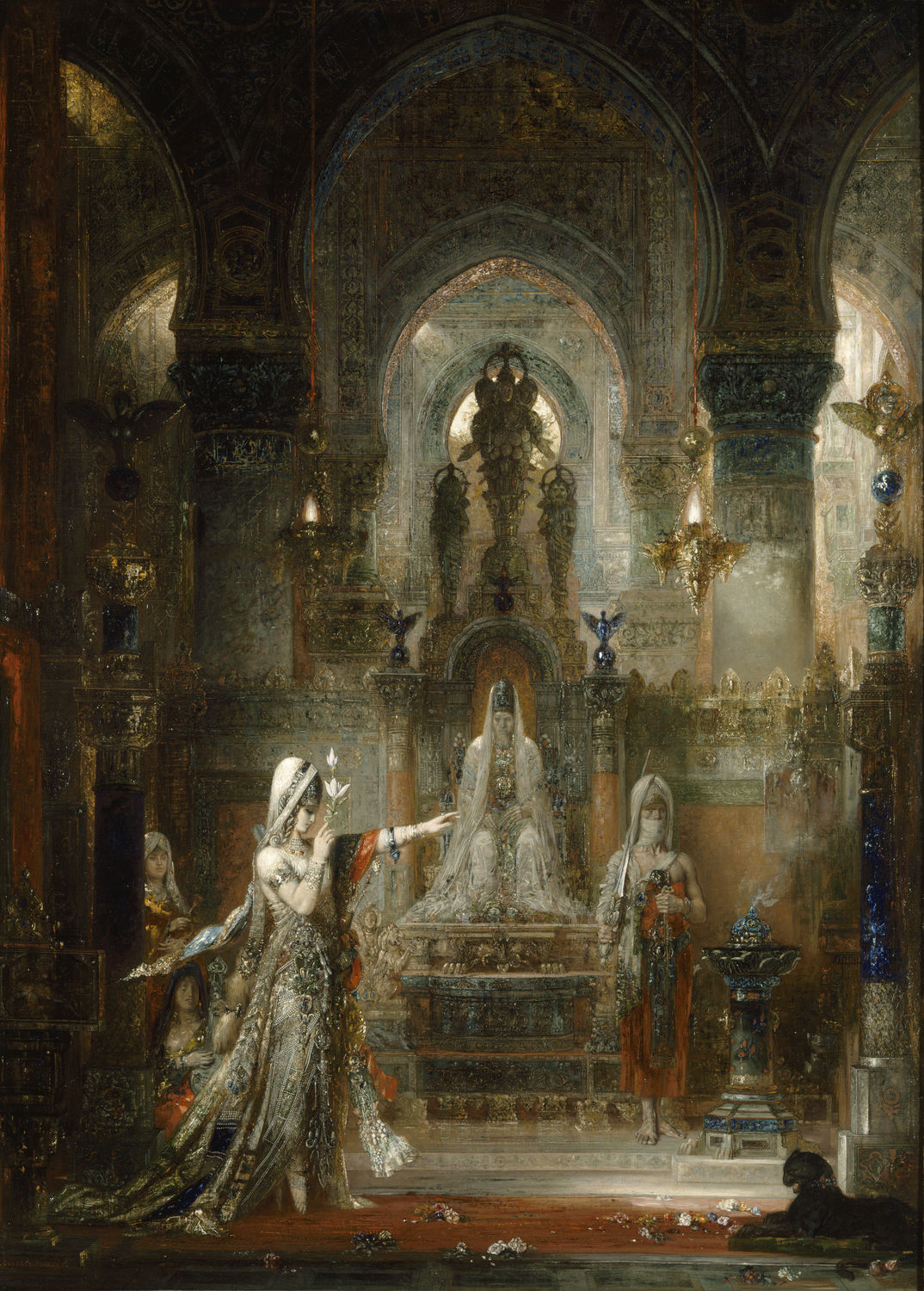
Salome Dancing Before Herod (1876), 143.5 x 104.3 cm, Hammer Museum

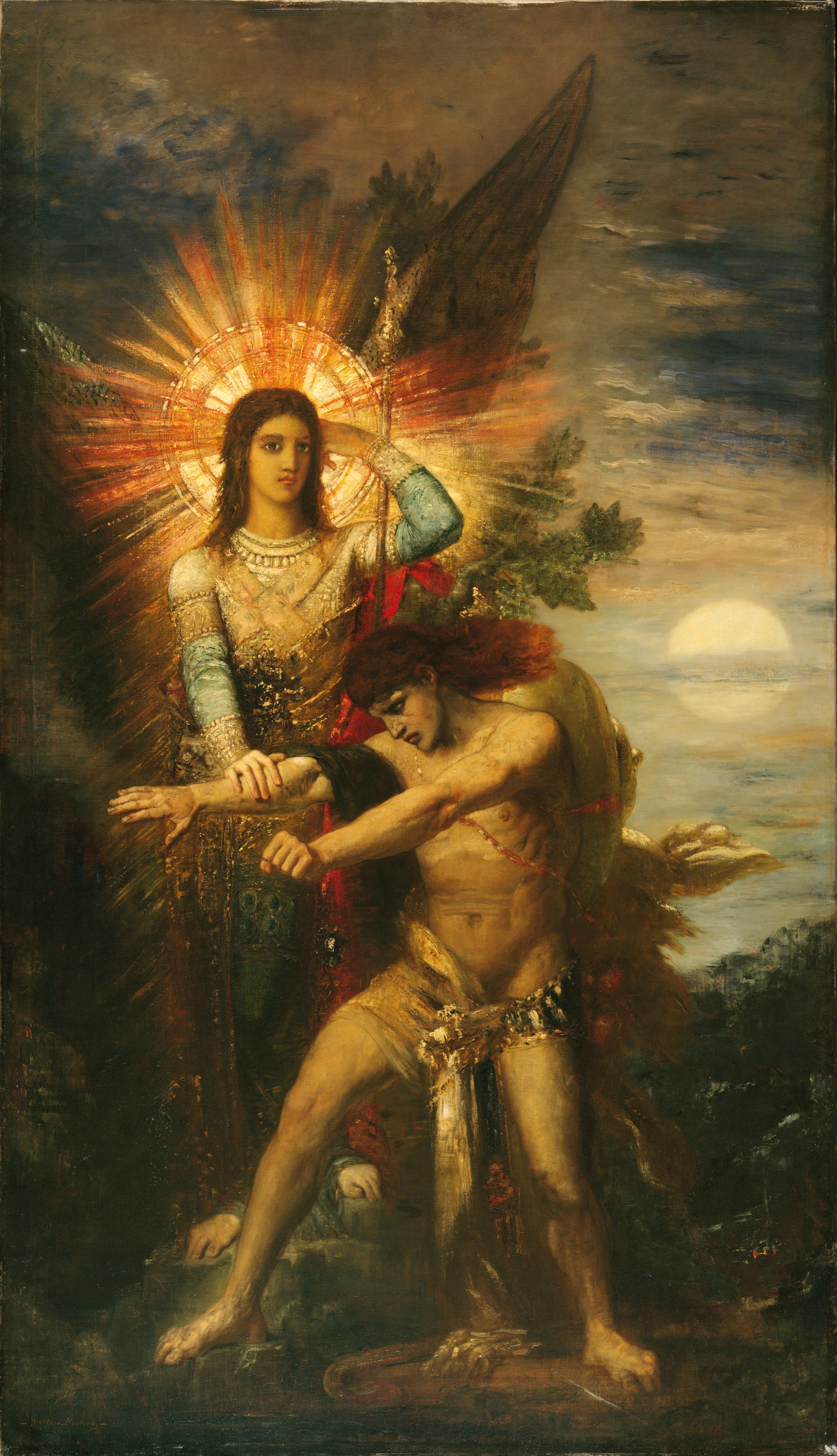
Jacob and the Angel (1878), 255 x 147.5 cm, Fogg Museum

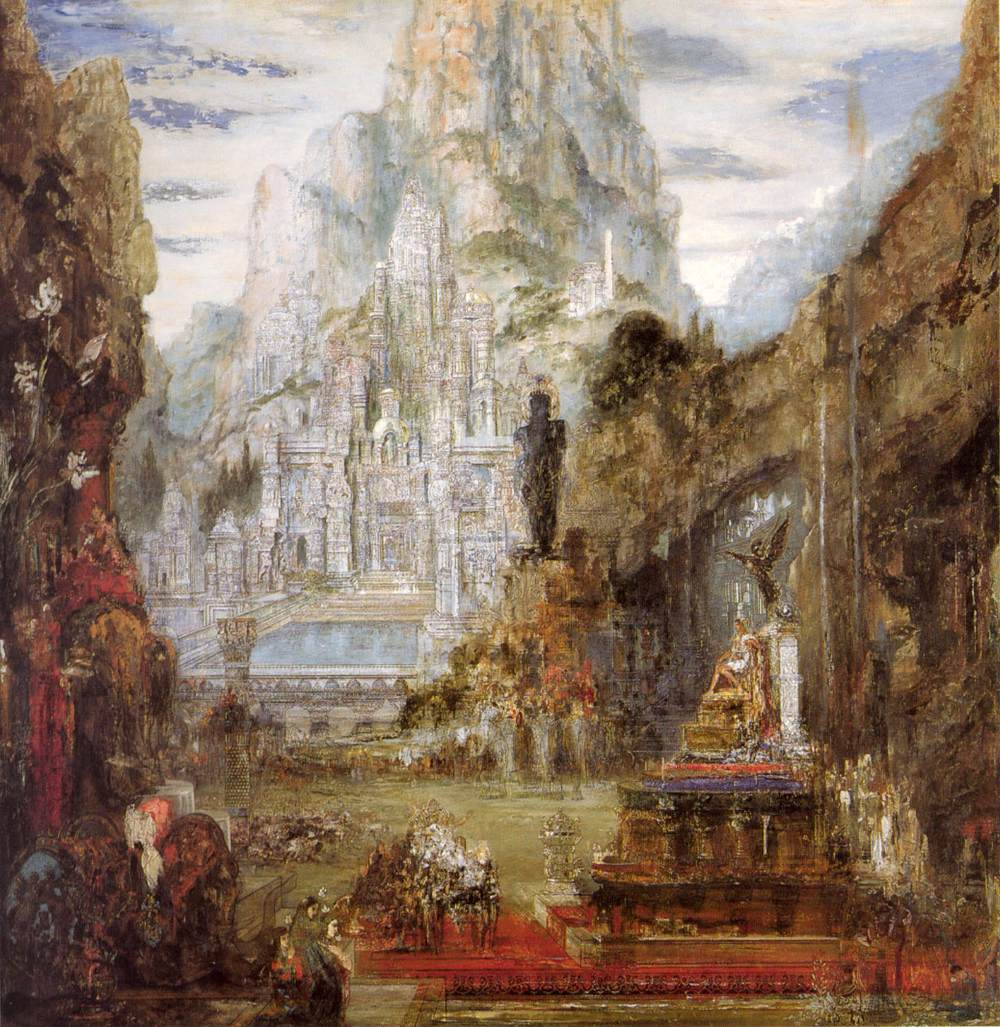
The Triumph of Alexander the Great (c. 1885), 155 x 155 cm, Musée Gustave Moreau

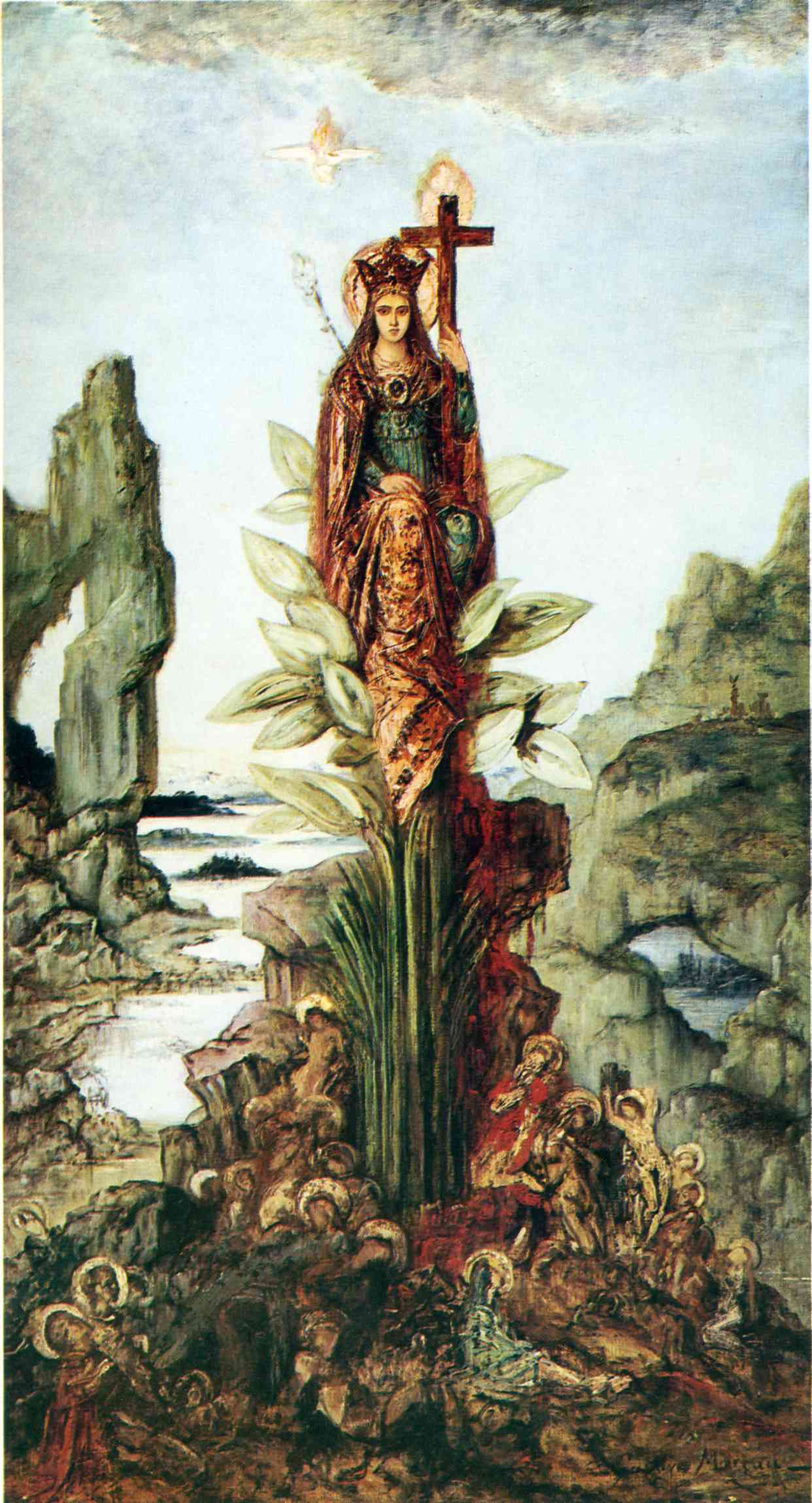
The Mystic Flower (c. 1890), 253 x 137 cm, Musée Gustave Moreau

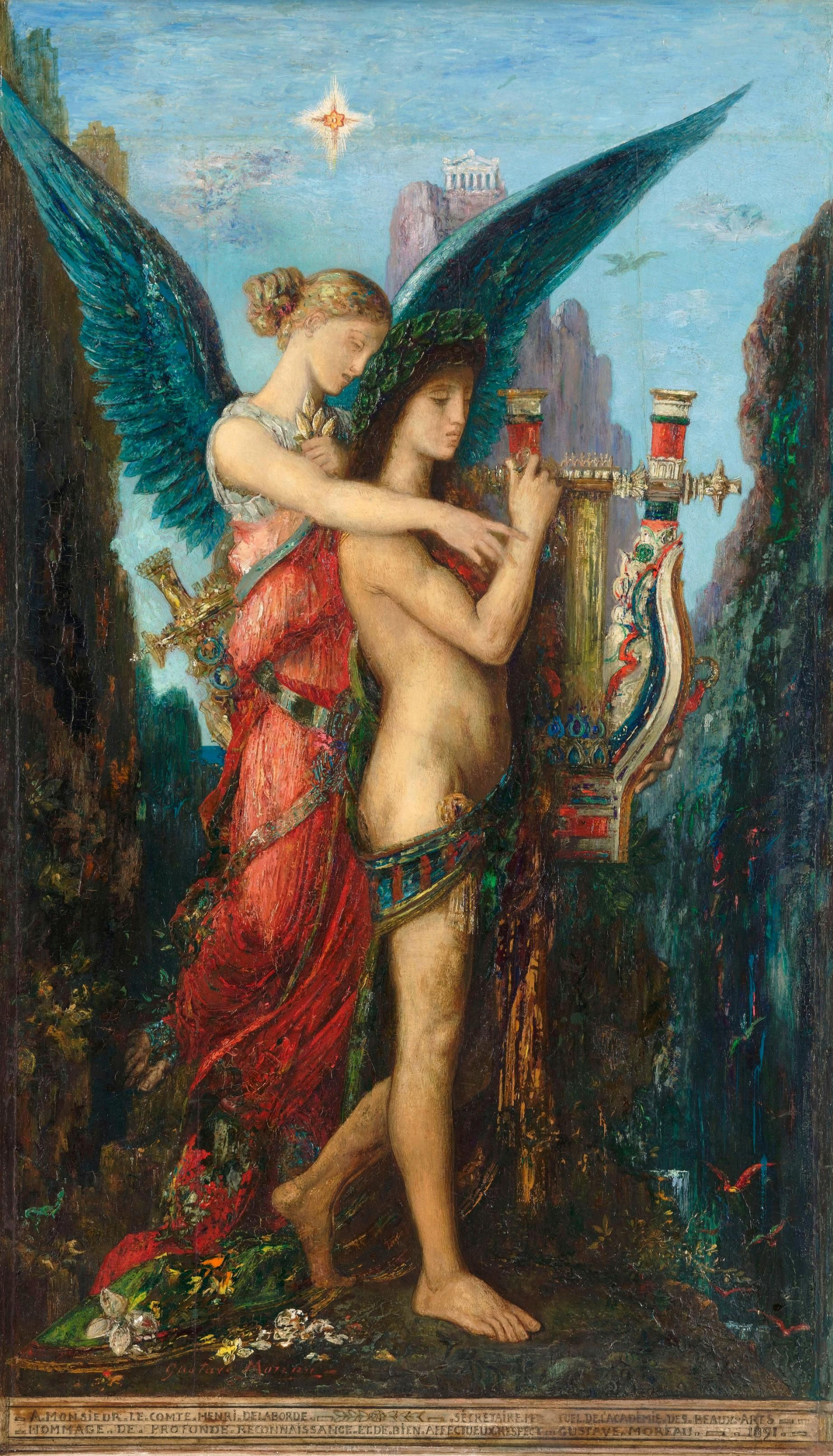
Hesiod and the Muse (1891), 59 x 34.5 cm, Musée d'Orsay

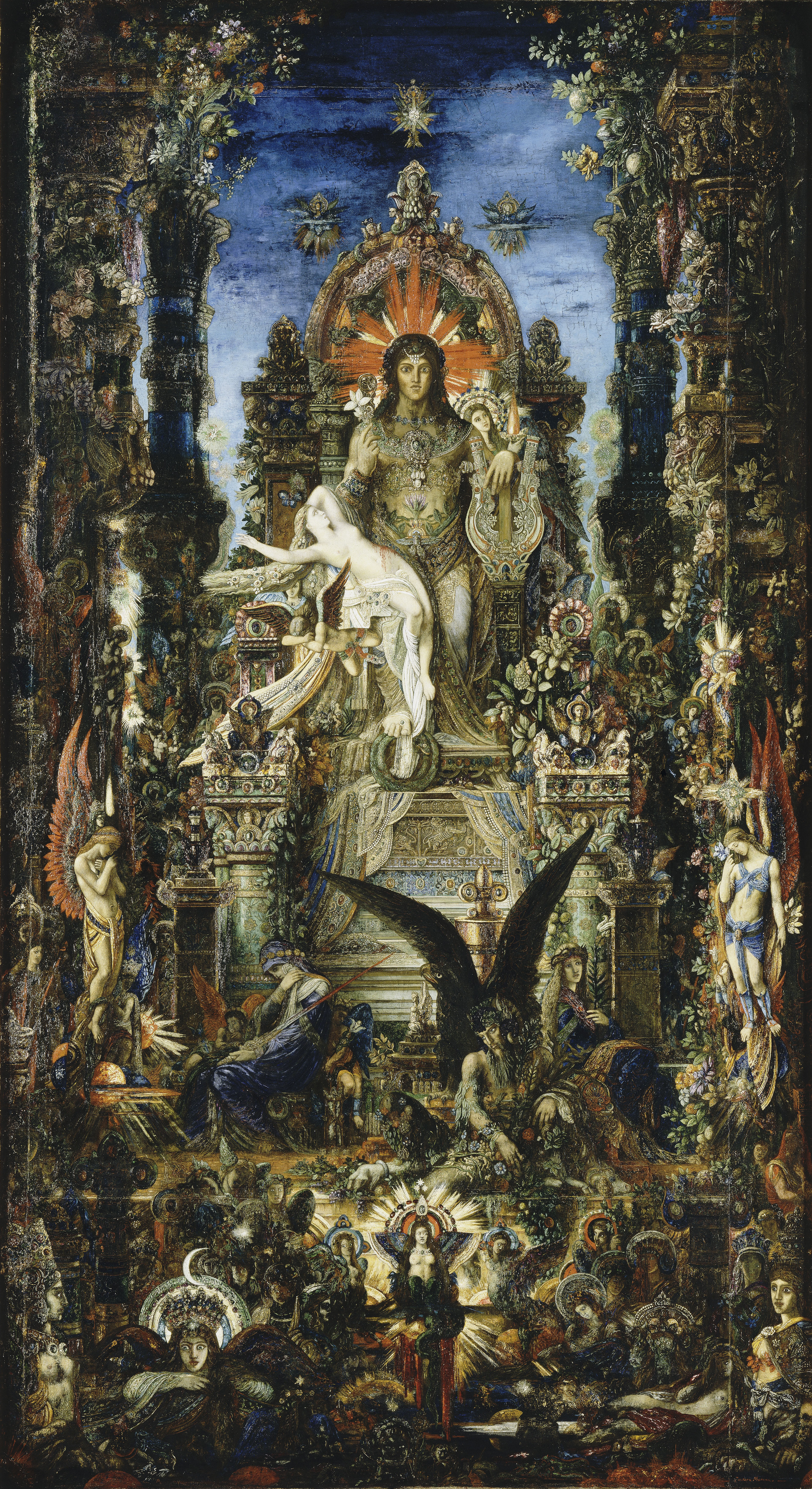
Jupiter and Semele (1894–95), 212 x 118 cm, Musée Gustave Moreau

=== Watercolors ===
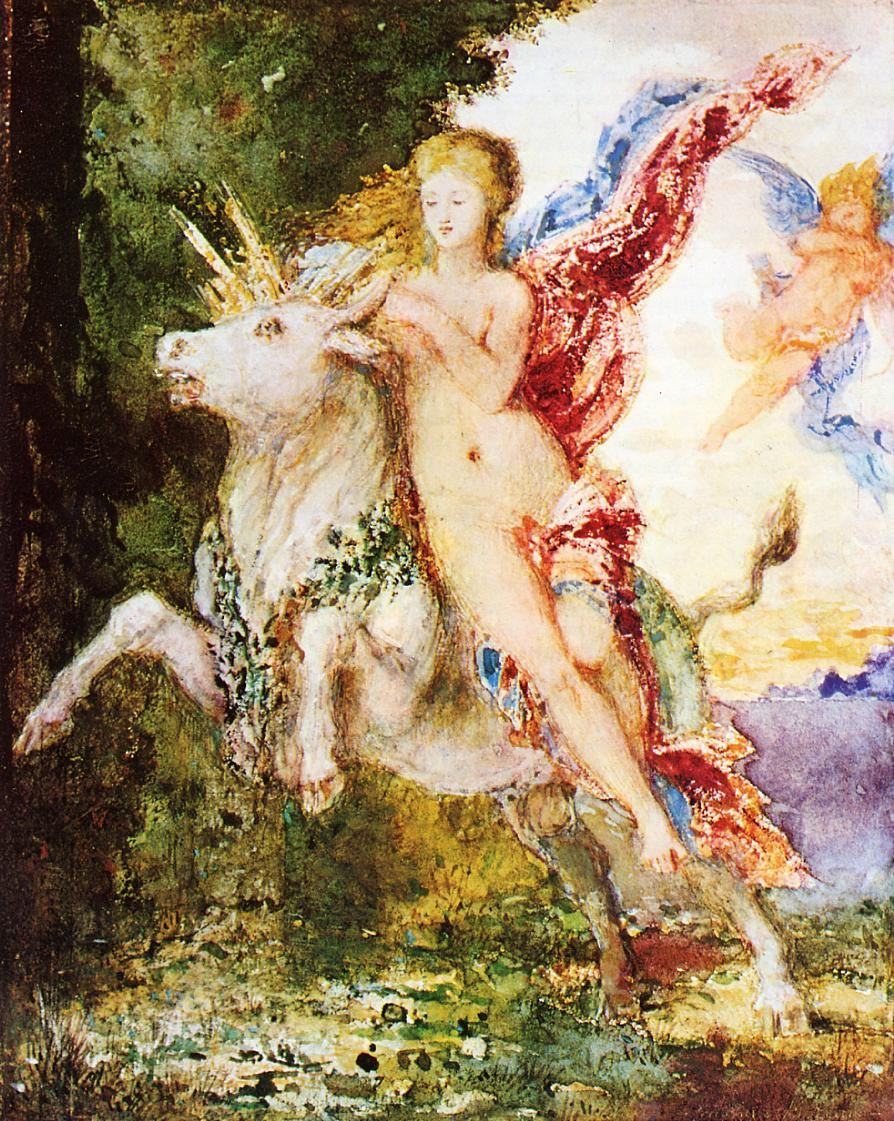
Europa and the Bull (c. 1869), 15.2 x 12.2 cm, Wadsworth Atheneum

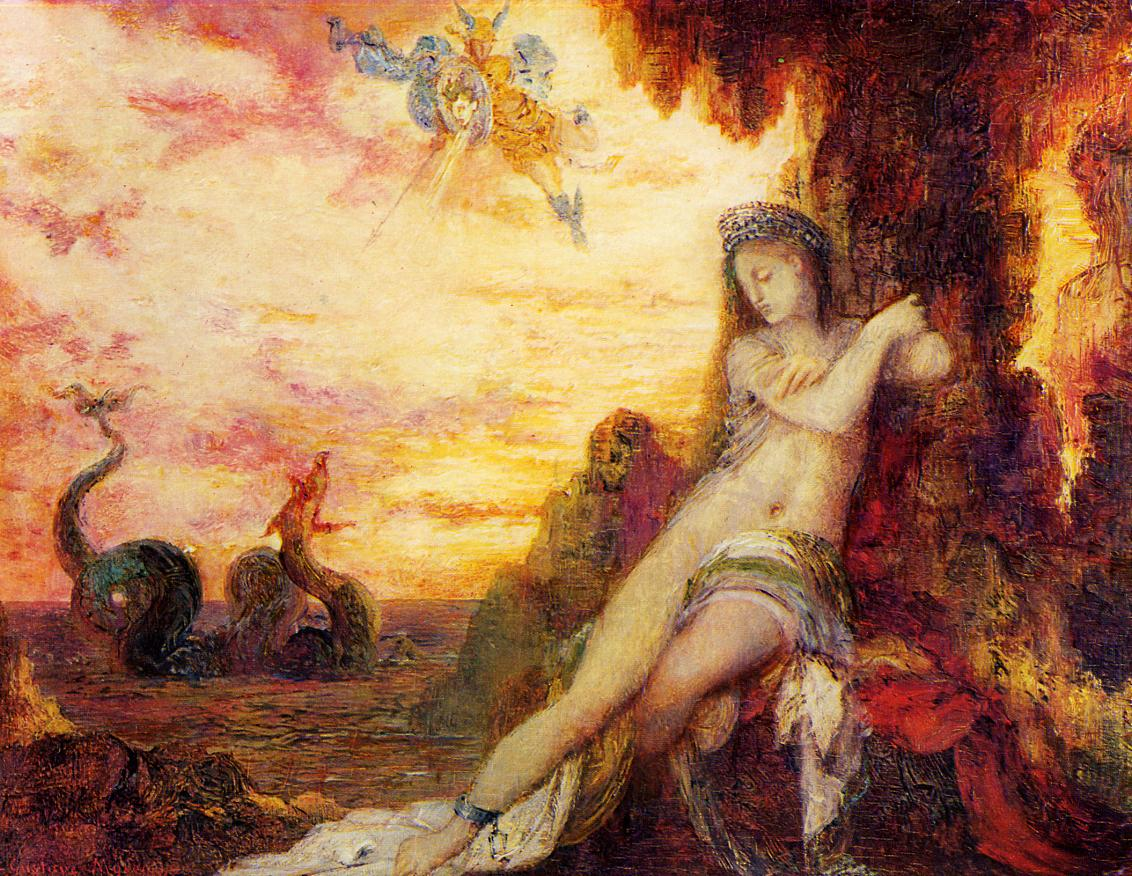
Perseus and Andromeda (1870s), 20 x 25.4 cm, Bristol Museum & Art Gallery

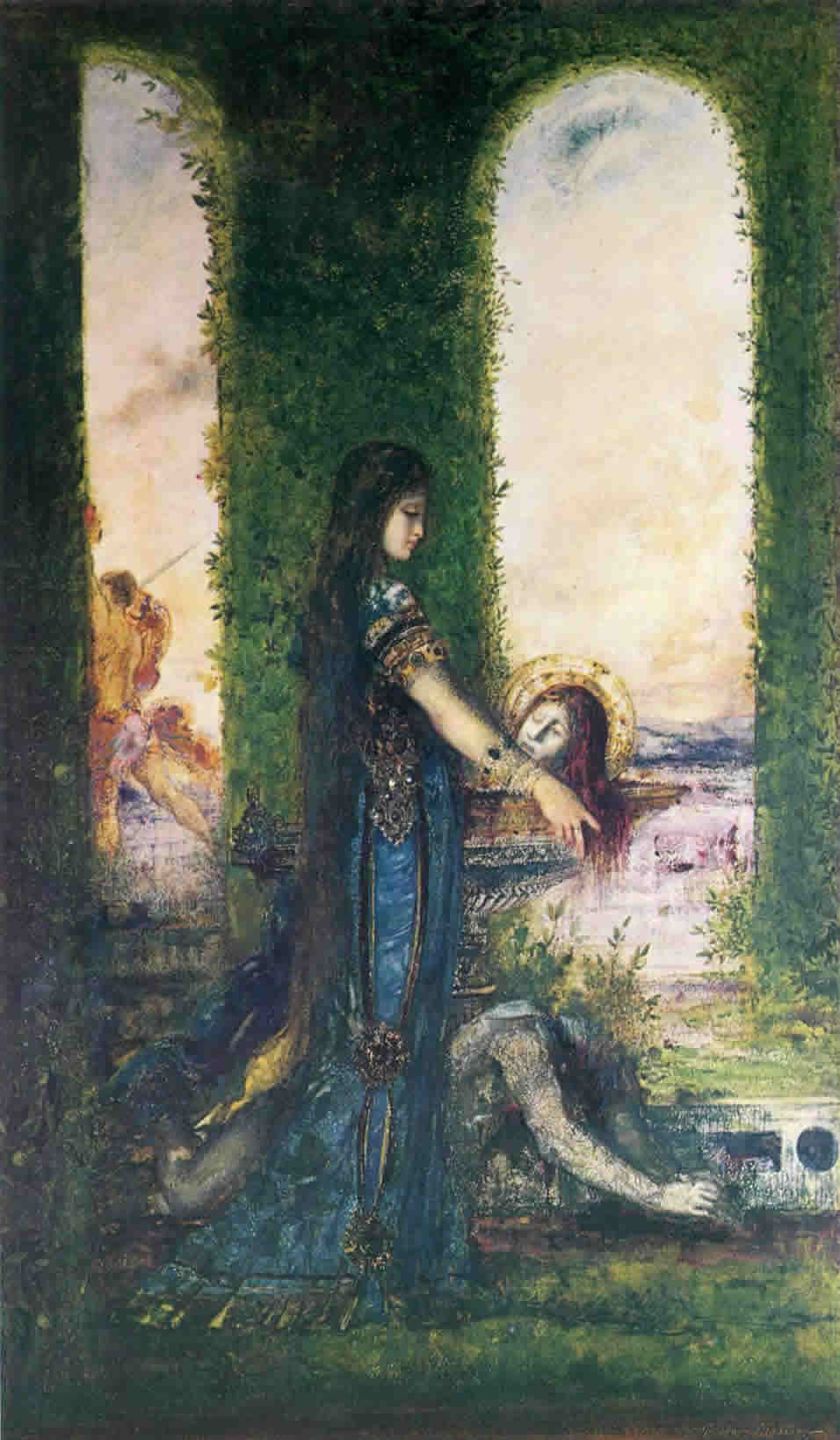
Salome in the Garden (1878), 72 x 43 cm, private collection

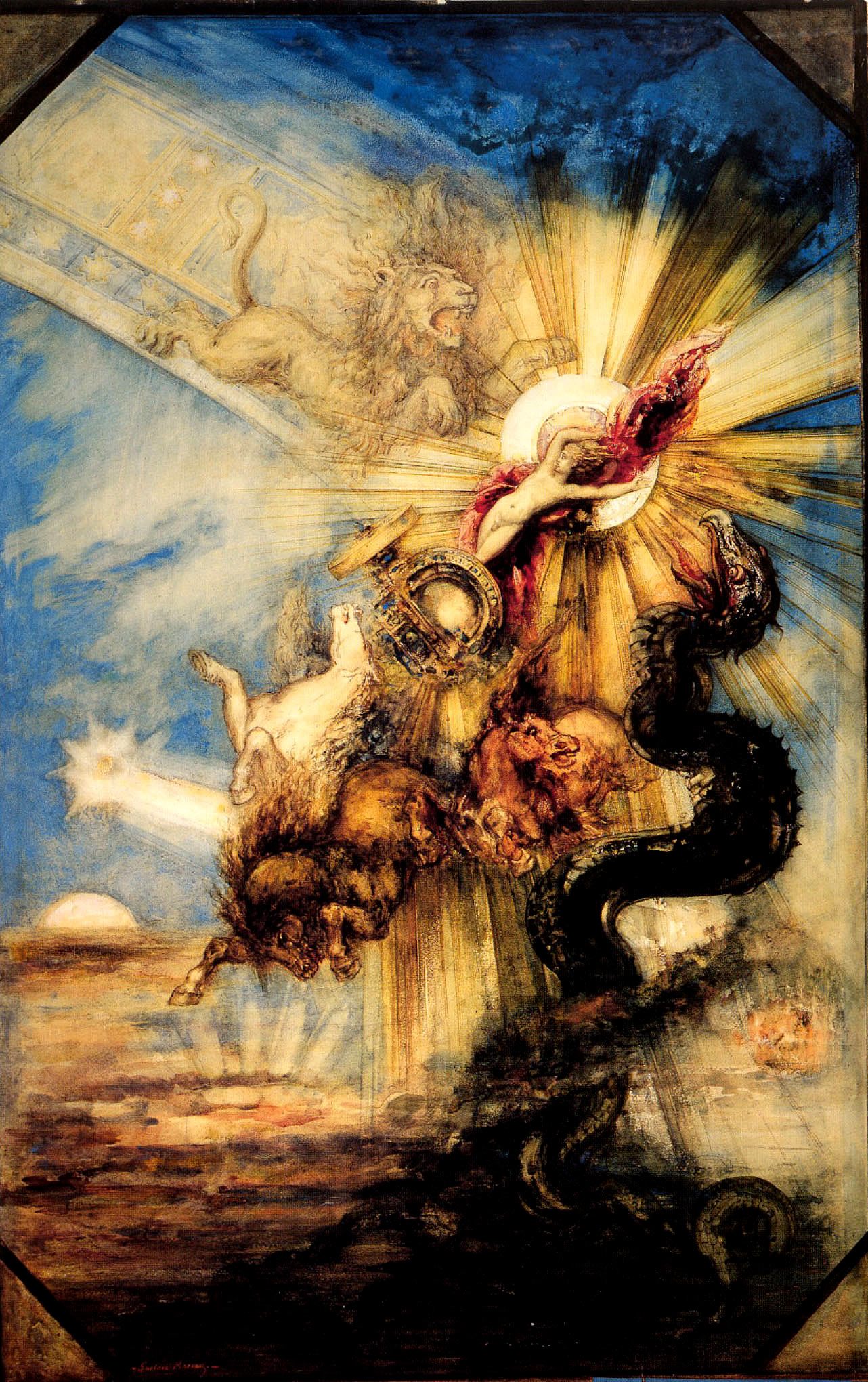
Phaéton (1878), 99 x 65 cm, Louvre

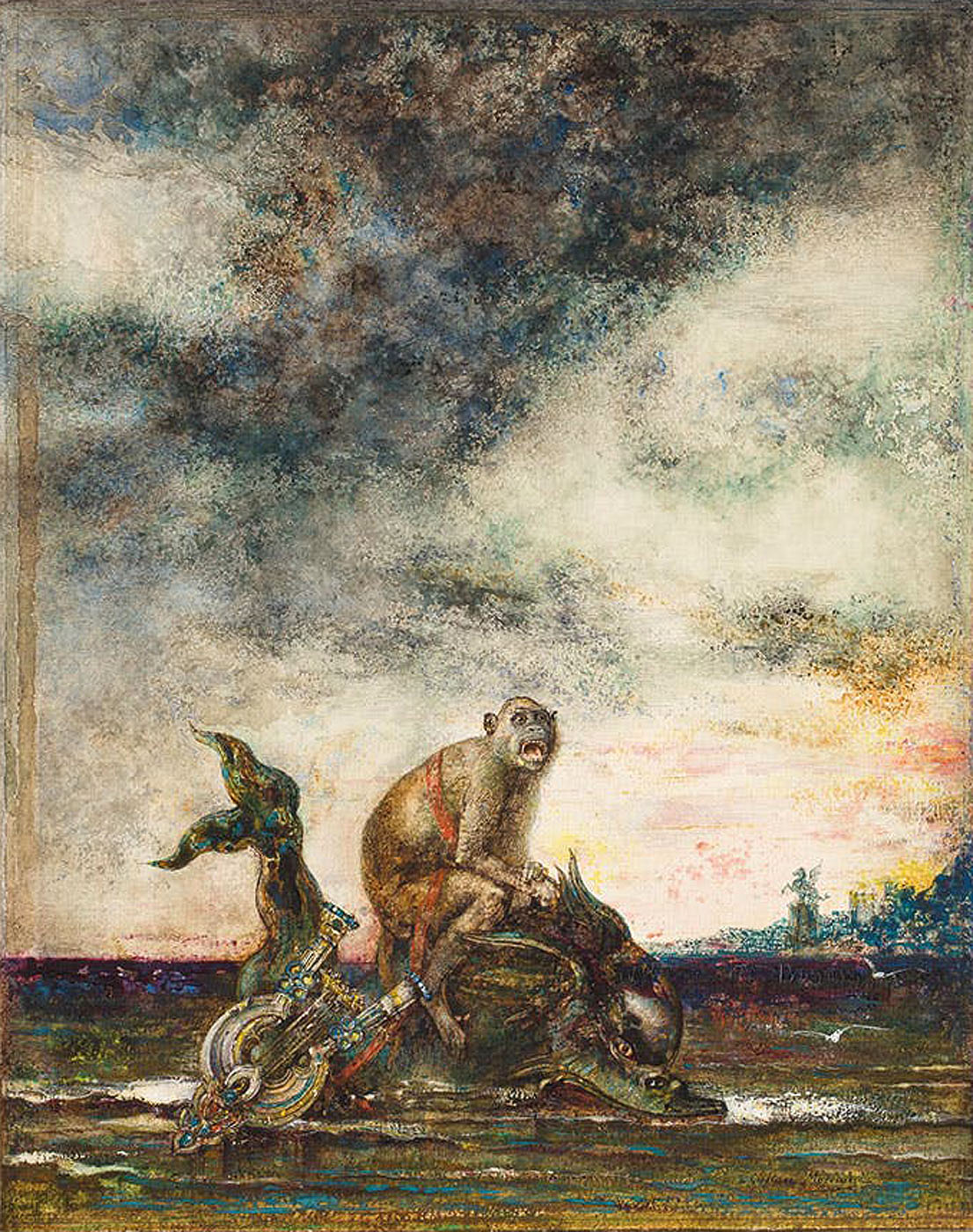
The Monkey and the Dolphin, from La Fontaine's Fables (1880s), watercolor, private collection

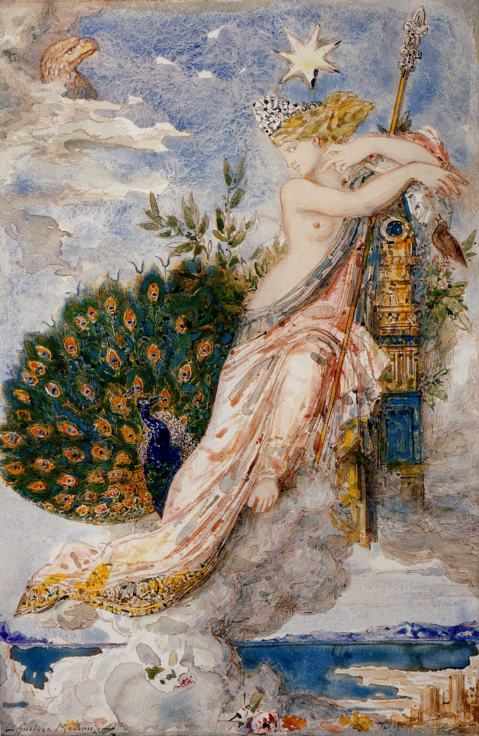
The Peacock Complaining to Juno (1881), 31 x 21 cm, Musée Gustave Moreau

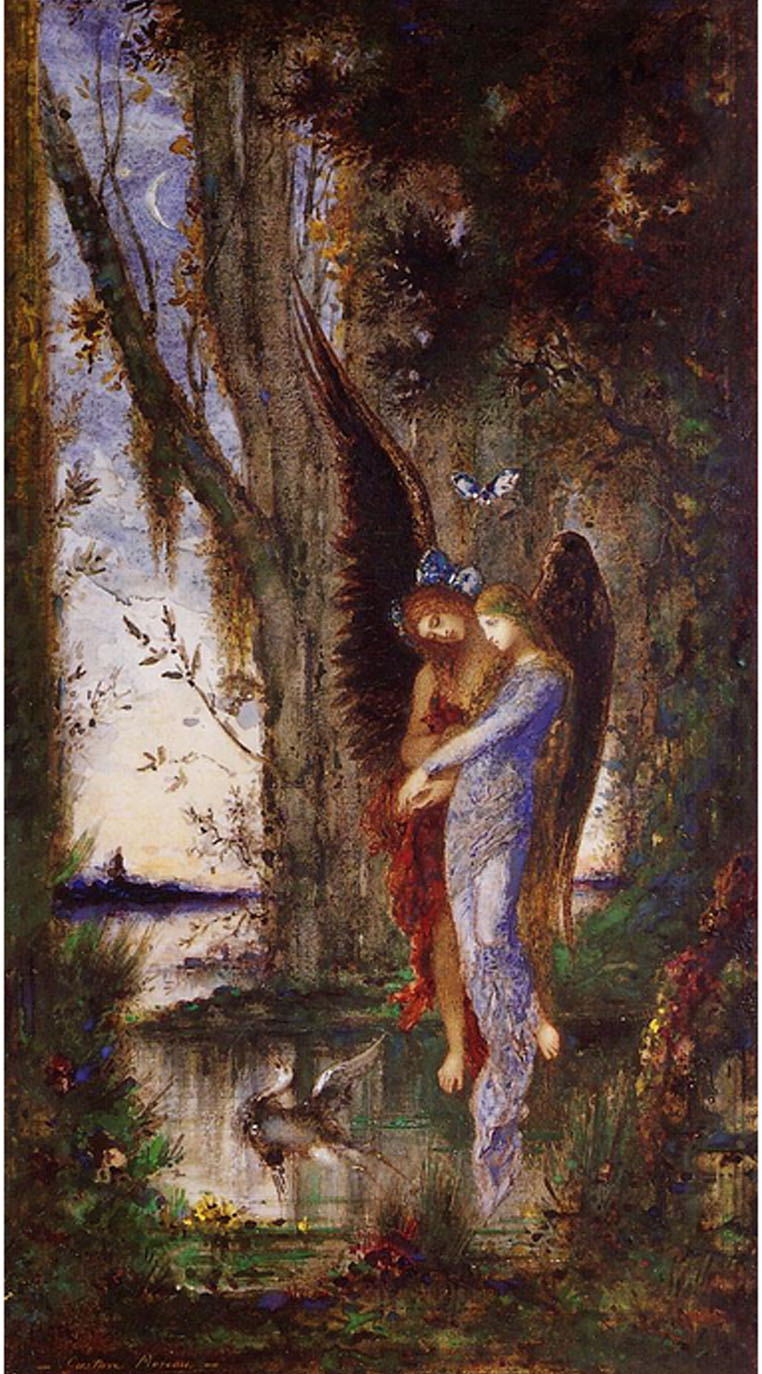
Evening and Sorrow (1882), 36.7 x 19.8 cm, Ephrussi de Rothschild Foundation

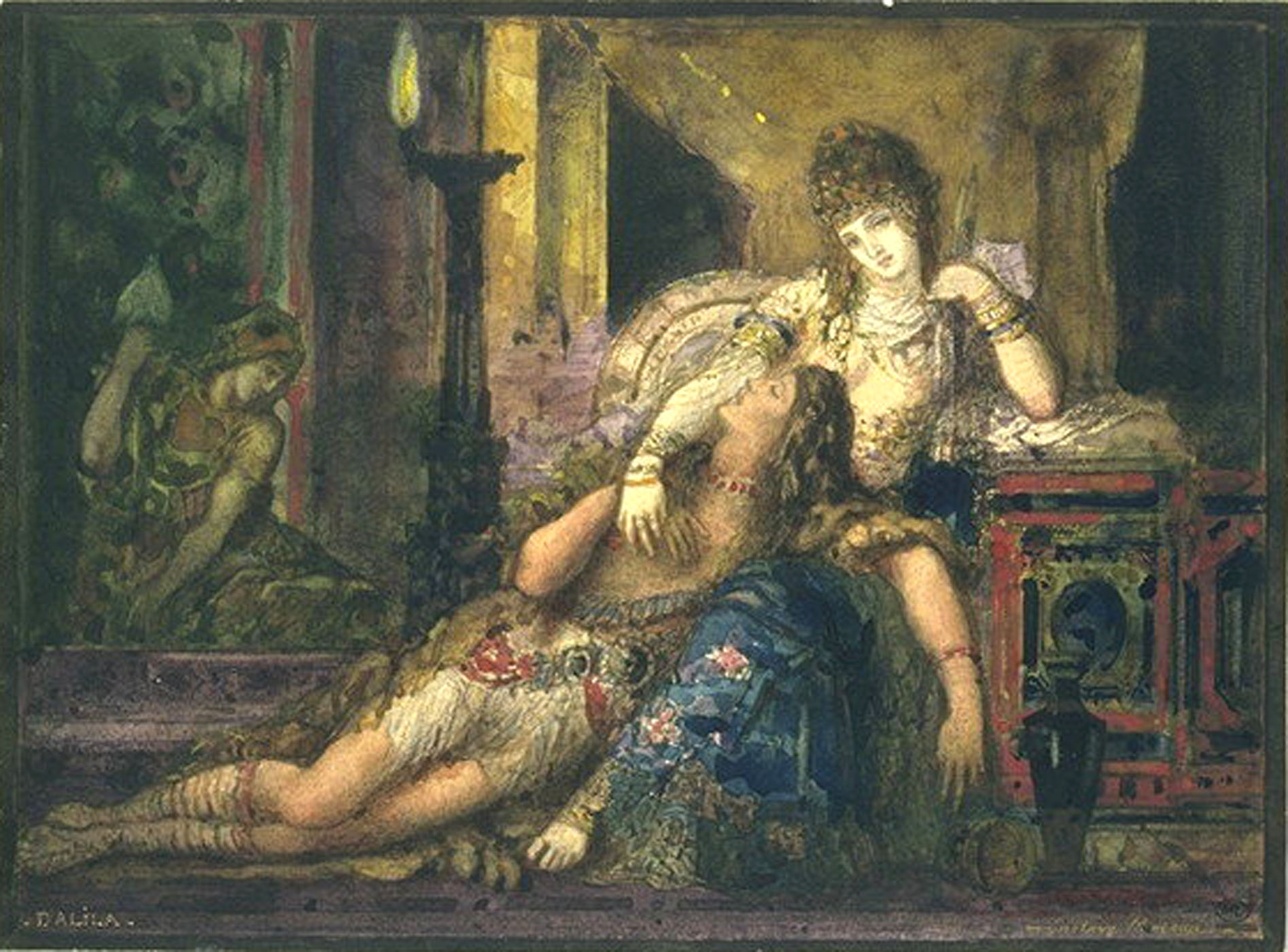
Samson and Delilah (1882), 15.8 x.21.3 cm, Louvre

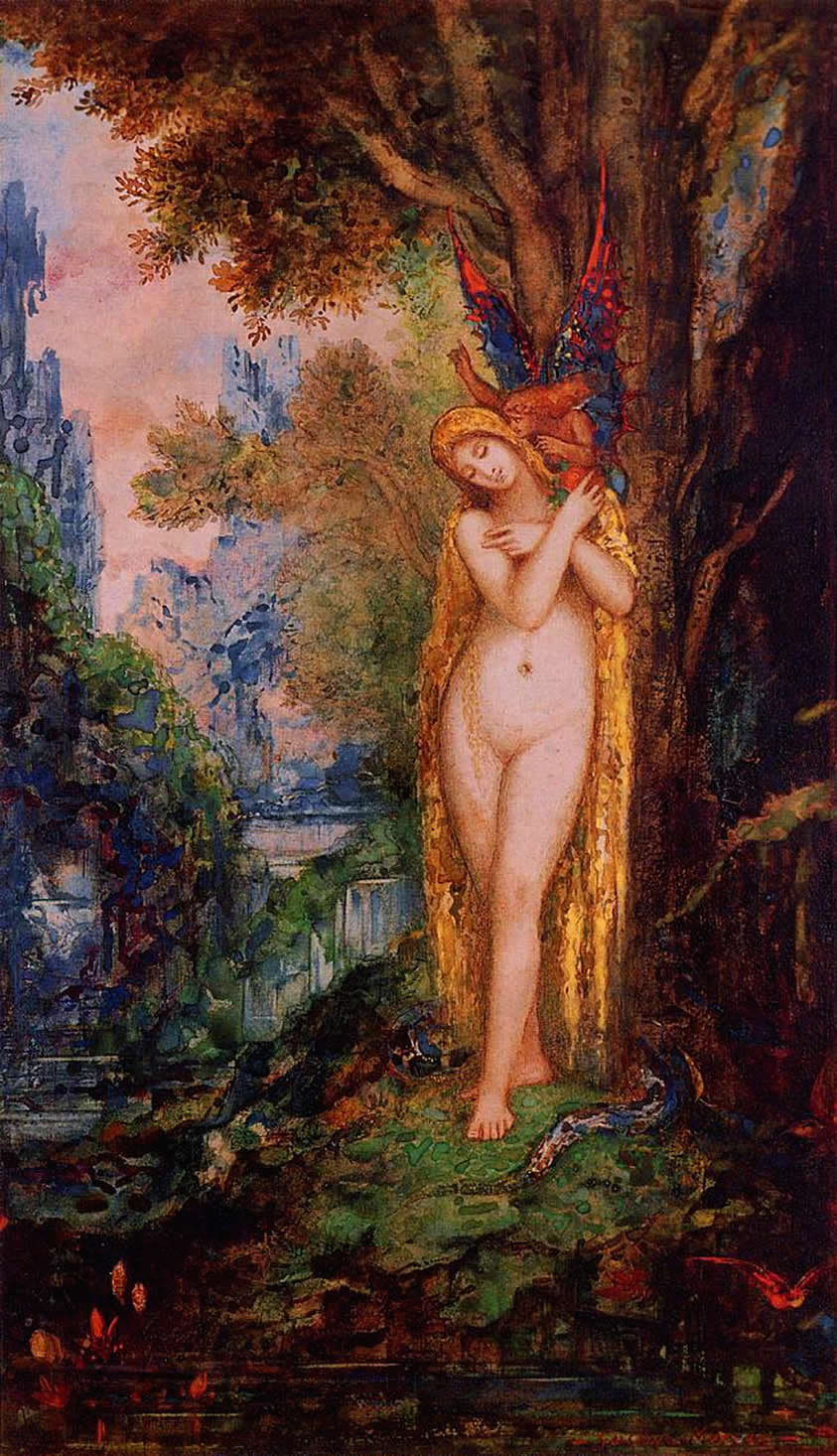
Eve (1885), private collection

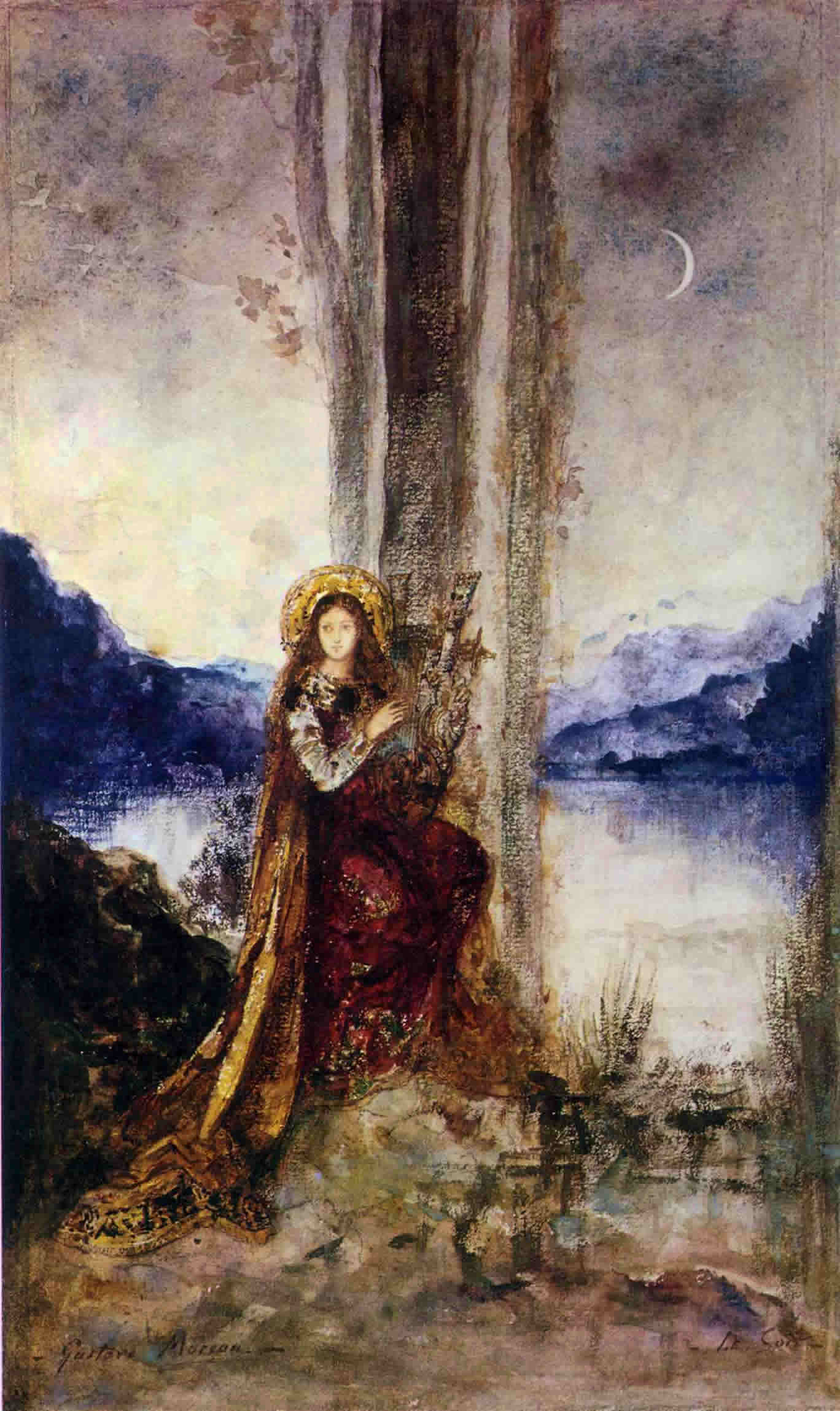
Evening (1887), 39 x 24 cm, Clemens Sels Museum

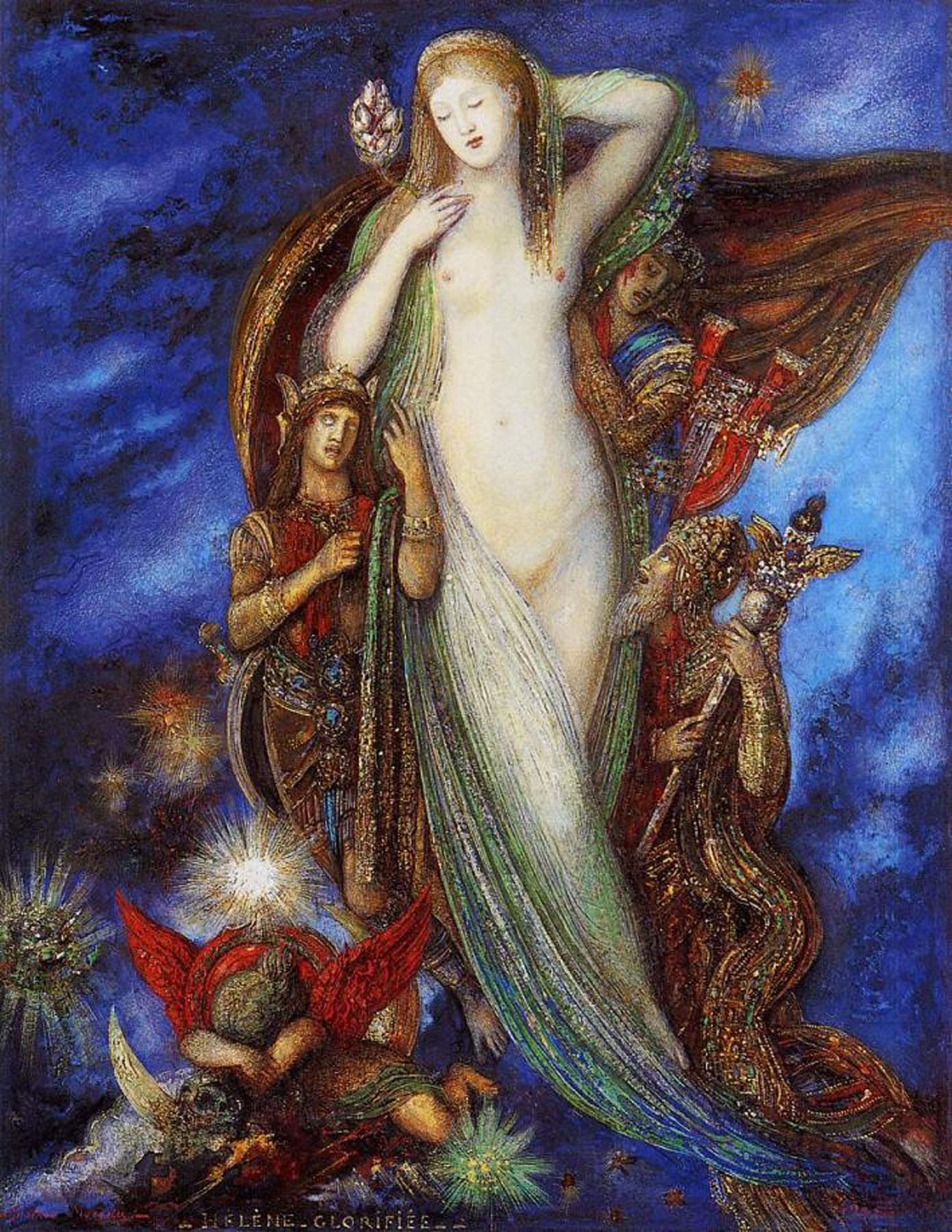
Helen Glorified (1897), 30.5 × 23.2 cm, private unknown

== See also ==
- L'Apparition
- Les Chimères (painting)
- La Sirène et le Poète (French)
