= Glaphyra (disambiguation) =

Glaphyra was an Anatolian princess who lived from around 35 BCE to 7 CE.

Glaphyra may also refer to:

- Glaphyra, a junior synonym of the beetle genus Molorchus
- Glaphyra (given name), including a list of people with the given name Glaphyra or Glafira
- Glaphyra (hetaera), mistress of Mark Antony
- Glaphyra, a ship launched in India in 1814 that was wrecked in 1854 after a career as a West Indiaman

== See also ==
- , including species names ending in "glaphyra"
- Glaphyria, a genus of moths
