= Archelaus II =

Archelaus II may refer to:

- Aeropus II of Macedon (r. 398/7–394/3 BC), who may have taken the name Archelaus
- Archelaus of Cilicia (died AD 38), king of Cilicia Trachea

== See also ==
- Archelaus I (disambiguation)
