= Glaphyra (given name) =

Glaphyra (or Glafira; Greek: Γλαφύρα) is a Greek feminine given name. It is derived from Greek γλαφυρός (glaphyros) meaning "hollowed" or "polished, elegant". The Slavic and Italian names Glafira are derived from it.

Persons bearing the name include:

- Glaphyra, Cappadocian princess
- Glaphyra (hetaera), ancient Greek courtesan
- Glafira Alymova, Russian noblewoman and harpist
- Glafira Deomidova, Russian soprano
- Glafira Dorosh, Ukrainian cook
- Glafira Martinovich, Belarusian gymnast
- Glafira Tarkhanova, Russian actress
