= List of shipwrecks in June 1854 =

The list of shipwrecks in June 1854 includes ships sunk, wrecked, grounded, or otherwise lost during June 1854.

== 1 June ==
List of shipwrecks: 1 June 1854
Ship	State	Description
Anna	Russia	The ship ran aground off Fehmarn, Duchy of Schleswig. She was on a voyage from Narva to an English port. She was refloated and put in to Travemünde for repairs.
Ann and Marys	United Kingdom	The schooner was in collision with Erin's Queen (United Kingdom) in the English Channel off Dover, Kent. She was on a voyage from Chichester, Sussex to Sunderland, County Durham. She put in to Dover, where she sank.
Europa	United Kingdom	The transport ship was destroyed by fire and sank in the Atlantic Ocean (48°01′N 7°30′W) with the loss of 21 lives. There were at least 94 survivors; they were rescued by the brig Clementine (United Kingdom and the schooner Kennett Kingsford (Prussia) and transferred to HMS Tribune and the transport ship Sir Robert Sale (United Kingdom). Europa was on a voyage from HMNB Devonport to the Mediterranean.
Iowa	United Kingdom	The ship was last sighted in the Atlantic Ocean whilst on a voyage from Liverpool, Lancashire to Melbourne, Victoria. No further trace, presumed foundered with the loss of all on board, her crew and 60 passengers.
Juno	United Kingdom	The collier, a brig, was wrecked on the Heaps Sandbank, in the North Sea off the coast of Essex. Her crew were rescued by a brig. She was on a voyage from South Shields, County Durham to London.
Lady Anne	United Kingdom	The brig was wrecked on the Middle Sand, in the North Sea off the coast of Essex. Her crew were rescued by the schooner Sea Lark (United Kingdom). She was on a voyage from Sunderland to London.
Sea Lark	United Kingdom	The schooner ran aground on the Middle Sand. She was on a voyage from Hartlepool, County Durham to Chatham, Kent. She was refloated but found to be severely leaky and was beached at Sheerness, Kent.
Stanfordham	United Kingdom	The ship was wrecked on the Gunfleet Sands, in the North Sea off the coast of Essex. Her crew were rescued.

== 2 June ==
List of shipwrecks: 2 June 1854
Ship	State	Description
Autumn	United Kingdom	The collier, a brig, sprang a leak and was beached at Ostend, Norfolk, where she was wrecked. Her crew were rescued by the Happisburgh Lifeboat. She was on a voyage from South Shields, County Durham to London.
Matilda	Norway	The full-rigged ship was wrecked on the Lemon and Owers Sandbank, in the English Channel. Her crew were rescued by the brig Creole (Bremen). Matilda was on a voyage from Sunderland, County Durham, United Kingdom to Algiers, Algeria.

== 3 June ==
List of shipwrecks: 3 June 1854
Ship	State	Description
City of Manchester	United Kingdom	The steamship ran aground off Windmill Island, near Philadelphia, Pennsylvania. She was on a voyage from Philadelphia to Liverpool, Lancashire.
Dreadnought	United Kingdom	The barque was abandoned in the Atlantic Ocean (43°50′N 66°06′W).
Louisa	(United Kingdom of Great Britain and Ireland) Antigua	The ship was wrecked on Sandy Island. She was on a voyage from Antigua to Tortola.
Shamrock	United Kingdom	The steamship sank at Waterford. All on board survived. She was on a voyage from New Ross, County Wexford to Waterford.

== 4 June ==
List of shipwrecks: 4 June 1854
Ship	State	Description
Najade	Prussia	The brig was wrecked on the Galloper Sand with the loss of four of her thirteen crew. Survivors were rescued by the smack Sea Flower (United Kingdom). Najade was on a voyage from Memel to Gloucester, United Kingdom. She was refloated on 7 June and towed in to Ramsgate, Kent, United Kingdom, where she arrived on 11 June in a capsized condition.

== 5 June ==
List of shipwrecks: 5 June 1854
Ship	State	Description
Sarah Sands	United Kingdom	The ship ran aground in the Strait of Belle Isle. She was on a voyage from Liverpool, Lancashire to Quebec City, Province of Canada, British North America. She was refloated on 8 June and resumed her voyage.
Symmetry	United Kingdom	The ship foundered off Juist, Kingdom of Hanover. Her crew were rescued. She was on a voyage from Newcastle upon Tyne, Northumberland to Hamburg.
Thornley Close	United Kingdom	The ship was wrecked on the Salt Key Shoals. Two crew reached Key West, Florida, United States in the cutter. The remainder of her crew, in the longboat, were reported missing. She was on a voyage from Belize City, British Honduras to Falmouth, Cornwall.
William Gladstone	United Kingdom	The ship was wrecked on Conch Shell Point, Inagua, Bahamas. She was on a voyage from Gonaïves, Haiti to Liverpool.

== 6 June ==
List of shipwrecks: 6 June 1854
Ship	State	Description
Fortuna	Kingdom of Hanover	The ship was driven ashore on Terschelling, Friesland, Netherlands. Her crew were rescued. She was on a voyage from Hartlepool, County Durham, United Kingdom to Oberndorf.
Robert and Ann	United Kingdom	The ship sprang a leak and was beached near Bridlington, Yorkshire. She was on a voyage from Sunderland, County Durham to London.

== 8 June ==
List of shipwrecks: 8 June 1854
Ship	State	Description
Beaver	United Kingdom	The ship was driven ashore on the Buxey Spit, in the North Sea off the coast of Suffolk. She was refloated on 11 June and resumed her voyage.
David Cannon	United Kingdom	The ship was wrecked on Big Dover Island. She was on a voyage from New York, United States to Quebec City, Province of Canada, British North America.
St. Mungo	(United Kingdom of Great Britain and Ireland) British North America	The ship was wrecked in the Ragged Islands, Nova Scotia. She was on a voyage from Pictou, Nova Scotia to Boston, Massachusetts, United States.
William and Jane	United Kingdom	The ship was driven ashore on the coast of Ross-shire. She was refloated.
Zetland	(United Kingdom of Great Britain and Ireland) British North America	The schooner was driven ashore and wrecked on "Pennant Island", Nova Scotia. She was on a voyage from Yarmouth to Pictou.

== 9 June ==
List of shipwrecks: 9 June 1854
Ship	State	Description
Mary H. Campbell	United States	The ship was driven ashore on Whitehead Island, Maine. She was on a voyage from "Sagua" to London, United Kingdom. She was refloated on 12 June and towed in to Rockland, Maine for repairs.
M. J. Kimball	United States	The ship ran aground on the Ganway Ledge, off Rockland, Maine and capsized. She was on a voyage from Sagua to London.
Railway King	United Kingdom	The flat foundered in the Irish Sea. Her crew survived. She was on a voyage from Bardsey Island, Pembrokeshire to Liverpool, Lancashire.

== 10 June ==
List of shipwrecks: 10 June 1854
Ship	State	Description
Gauntlet	United Kingdom	The ship was driven ashore at New York, United States. She was refloated the next day.
Union	United Kingdom	The ship was wrecked off Scatterie Island, Nova Scotia, British North America. Her crew were rescued. She was on a voyage from Sydney, Nova Scotia to Boston, Massachusetts, United States.

== 11 June ==
List of shipwrecks: 11 June 1854
Ship	State	Description
Wear	United Kingdom	The brig was driven ashore on the east coast of Miscou Island, New Brunswick, British North America. Her crew were rescued. She was on a voyage from North Shields, County Durham to Dalhousie, New Brunswick, British North America.
Welcome	United Kingdom	The ship ran aground on the Sizewell Bank, in the North Sea off the coast of Suffolk and was damaged. She floated off in a leaky condition and was then wrecked on the Newcombe Sand. She was on a voyage from Sunderland, County Durham to London.
No. 103	United Kingdom	The steamship ran aground off Broadstairs, Kent.

== 12 June ==
List of shipwrecks: 12 June 1854
Ship	State	Description
Albion	United Kingdom	The sloop ran aground on the Great Burbo Bank, in Liverpool Bay. She floated off and sank in the Crosby Channel. She was on a voyage from Liverpool, Lancashire to Cardiff. She refloated the next day when her cargo of salt dissolved and was beached at Waterloo, Lancashire.
Belochee	United Kingdom	The ship was driven ashore at Crosby Point, Lancashire. She was on a voyage from Mobile, Alabama, United States to Liverpool. She was refloated and taken in to Liverpool.
Ganymede	(United Kingdom of Great Britain and Ireland) British North America	The ship was driven ashore on Campobello Island, New Brunswick. She was on a voyage from Eastport, Maine, United States to London. She was refloated the next day and towed back to Eastport.

== 13 June ==
List of shipwrecks: 13 June 1854
Ship	State	Description
Hygeia	United Kingdom	The brig ran aground and was wrecked on the Pratas Shoal, between Hong Kong and Formosa with the loss of 390 of the 519 people on board. The Chinese schooner Victoria rescued 147 survivors. Hygeia was on a voyage from Hong Kong to San Francisco, California, United States.
Magnus	Sweden	The schooner was run into by the steamship Gothenburg (Sweden) and sank at Gothenburg.

== 14 June ==
List of shipwrecks: 14 June 1854
Ship	State	Description
Hector	United Kingdom	The brig was driven ashore at Westkapelle, Zeeland, Netherlands. She was on a voyage from Antwerp, Belgium to Newcastle upon Tyne, Northumberland. She was refloated and found to be leaky.
Nova Scotia	(United Kingdom of Great Britain and Ireland) British North America	The barque was wrecked on the Mun Ledge. She was on a voyage from Boston, Massachusetts, United States to Saint John, New Brunswick.

== 16 June ==
List of shipwrecks: 16 June 1854
Ship	State	Description
Estafette	United Kingdom	The ship ran aground on the Corton Sands, in the North Sea off the coast of Suffolk, United Kingdom. She was on a voyage from Sunderland, County Durham, United Kingdom to Bordeaux, Gironde.
Hector	United Kingdom	The brig was driven ashore at Vlissingen, Zeeland, Netherlands. She was on a voyage from Antwerp, Belgium to Newcastle upon Tyne, Northumberland. She was refloated and found to be leaky.
Major	United Kingdom	The flatboat was run into by Bostonian (United States), holed by her own anchor and sank at Liverpool, Lancashire.

== 17 June ==
List of shipwrecks: 17 June 1854
Ship	State	Description
Abergeldie	United Kingdom	The full-rigged ship was wrecked on a reef in the Gaspar Strait. Her crew abandoned ship the next day; they were rescued by Euphrates (United Kingdom). Abergeldie was on a voyage from London to Hong Kong.
Daphne	United Kingdom	The schooner struck the Gwhamgarcey Rock and sank in Ramsay Sound. Her crew were rescued. She was on a voyage from Barrow-in-Furness, Lancashire to Newport, Monmouthshire.
Germania	Prussia	The sloop was abandoned off the Trindelen Rock. She was on a voyage from Hull, Yorkshire, United Kingdom to Königsberg. She was subsequently taken in to Gothenburg, Sweden in a waterlogged condition.

== 19 June ==
List of shipwrecks: 19 June 1854
Ship	State	Description
Ceres	United Kingdom	The steamship struck the Cabadello Rock, at the mouth of the Douro. She was on a voyage from London to Porto, Portugal. She was refloated and taken in to Porto.
Glaphyra	United Kingdom	The ship was driven ashore and wrecked on the east point of Nevis. She was on a voyage from London to Saint Kitts.
Thomasine	United Kingdom	The barque was wrecked on a reef in the Pacific Ocean (16°29′S 148°03′E with the loss of a crew member. Survivors took to the boats. On 4 July Bato (Netherlands) rescued the survivors. Thomasine was on a voyage from Sydney, New South Wales to Batavia, Netherlands East Indies.

== 20 June ==
List of shipwrecks: 20 June 1854
Ship	State	Description
Batavia	Netherlands	The steamship ran aground on the Brielle Flats. She was on a voyage from Rotterdam, South Holland to London, United Kingdom.
Enchantress	United Kingdom	The barque ran aground on The Shingles, off the north Kent coast. She was on a voyage from Demerara, British Guiana to London. She was refloated with assistance from a tug and taken in tow for London.

== 21 June ==
List of shipwrecks: 21 June 1854
Ship	State	Description
Eliza	United Kingdom	The full-rigged ship was driven ashore west of Lavernock Point, Glamorgan. She was on a voyage from Bristol, Gloucestershire to Demerara, British Guiana.

== 22 June ==
List of shipwrecks: 22 June 1854
Ship	State	Description
Topaz	United States	The ship was wrecked on the Pratos Shoal. Her crew were rescued by Cassiterides (Flag unknown). Topaz was on a voyage from Hong Kong to San Francisco, California.

== 23 June ==
List of shipwrecks: 23 June 1854
Ship	State	Description
Cape Horn	(United Kingdom of Great Britain and Ireland) Victoria	The barque ran aground at Geelong. She was on a voyage from Hobart, Van Diemen's Land to Geelong.
Fanny	United Kingdom	The ship ran aground on The Shingles, off the north Kent coast. She was on a voyage from Milton Regis, Kent to HMNB Devonport. She was refloated and resumed her voyage.
Grecian	(United Kingdom of Great Britain and Ireland) Victoria	The brig ran aground at Geelong.
Quicksilver	United Kingdom	The ship ran aground on the Holm Sand, in the North Sea off the coast of Suffolk. She was on a voyage from Sunderland, County Durham to London.
Scotia	(United Kingdom of Great Britain and Ireland) Victoria	The brigantine ran aground at Geelong. She was on a voyage from Hobart to Geelong.
Success	United Kingdom	The ship sprang a leak and was beached in Lough Swilly. She was on a voyage from Liverpool, Lancashire to Galway. She was refloated on 29 June and taken in to Londonderry for repairs.
Vigilant	(United Kingdom of Great Britain and Ireland) Victoria	The brig ran aground at Geelong. She was on a voyage from Hobart to Geelong.

== 24 June ==
List of shipwrecks: 24 June 1854
Ship	State	Description
Grace Darling	United Kingdom	The ship was driven ashore at "Surge View". She was on a voyage from Liverpool, Lancashire to Westport, County Mayo. She was refloated and taken in to Westport.

== 25 June ==
List of shipwrecks: 25 June 1854
Ship	State	Description
Breeze	United Kingdom	The ship was in collision with Lapwing (Hamburg) and sank off Falsterbo, Sweden. Her crew were rescued by Lapwing. Breeze was on a voyage from Königsberg, Prussia to an English port.
Midas	United Kingdom	The ship was beached in the Chincha Islands, Peru. She was on a voyage from the Chincha Islands to Queenstown, County Cork. She was declared a total loss.
Paramatta	United Kingdom	The ship departed from The Downs for Ceylon. No further trace, presumed foundered with the loss of all hands.
Sir Henry Hardinge	United Kingdom	The ship was driven ashore in Trial Bay.

== 26 June ==
List of shipwrecks: 26 June 1854
Ship	State	Description
Anne Kenny	United Kingdom	The ship ran aground on Anticosti Island, Nova Scotia, British North America. She was on a voyage from Liverpool, Lancashire to Quebec City, Province of Canada, British North America.
Belinda	United Kingdom	Sailing from her home port of Cardiff, Glamorgan, to Cork, with a cargo of limestone, the cutter hit the Bishop Rock in the Isles of Scilly in thick fog. She got off the rock but took in water and foundered nearby.
Bolina	United Kingdom	The ship was driven ashore at the Sand Head, Hampshire. She was on a voyage from London to Llanelly, Glamorgan.
Cole	France	The schooner was driven ashore and wrecked at Swansea, Glamorgan. Her crew were rescued. She was on a voyage from Nantes, Loire-Inférieure to Swansea.
Despatch	United Kingdom	The schooner was run into by Mary Carson (United Kingdom) and sank off Cemlyn, Anglesey. She was on a voyage from Liverpool to Rotterdam, South Holland, Netherlands.
Fatima	United Kingdom	The barque was wrecked on the Great Detached Reef in the Coral Sea. She was on a voyage from Melbourne, Victoria, Australia, to Batavia, Netherlands East Indies.
Gustave Irma	France	The brig was driven ashore and wrecked at Worms Head, Glamorgan. Her crew were rescued. She was on a voyage from Cardiff to Bayonne, Basses-Pyrénées.
John and Jane	United Kingdom	The flat struck a rock and sank at Porthdinllaen, Caernarfonshire. She was on a voyage from Wicklow to Chester, Cheshire.
Kangaroo	United Kingdom	The steamship was damaged by fire in the River Thames at Horsleydown, Surrey. She was on a voyage from Manila, Spanish East Indies to London.
May	United Kingdom	The flat sank off Rhyl, Denbighshire with the loss of three of her four crew.
Sophia	United Kingdom	The schooner ran aground on Taylor's Bank, in Liverpool Bay. She was on a voyage from Liverpool to Lowestoft, Suffolk. She was refloated the next day but was consequently beached at Crosby Point, Lancashire. Her crew were rescued. Sophia was refloated on 28 June and taken in to Liverpool.
Olympia, and Trade Wind	United States	The full-rigged ships were in collision in the Atlantic Ocean (41°50′N 57°20′W) and sank with the loss of 24 lives. Survivors were rescued by Stad Antwerpen (Belgium). Olympia lost three of her 40 passengers and three of her fourteen crew. She was on a voyage from Liverpool, Lancashire to Halifax, Nova Scotia and Boston, Massachusetts, United States. Trade Wind lost seventeen of her 35 crew, but all seventeen passengers were rescued; one crew man was rescued on 2 July by Empire (United Kingdom), having clung to the ship's foremast for six days. She was on a voyage from Mobile, Alabama, United States to Halifax and Liverpool.
Zenith	France	The brig was driven ashore near Porthcawl, Glamorgan with the loss of three of her crew. She was on a voyage from Cardiff to Bône, Algeria.

== 27 June ==
List of shipwrecks: 27 June 1854
Ship	State	Description
Assaye	United Kingdom	The full-rigged ship capsized at Liverpool, Lancashire. She was righted.
Paul	United Kingdom	The schooner ran aground on the Great Burbo Bank, in Liverpool Bay with the loss of a crew member. Survivors were rescued by the tug Liver (United Kingdom). Paul was on a voyage from Barrow-in-Furness, Lancashire to Newport, Monmouthshire.
Roslin Castle	United Kingdom	The ship sank at Plymouth, Devon.

== 28 June ==
List of shipwrecks: 28 June 1854
Ship	State	Description
Elizabeth	United Kingdom	The barque ran aground on a reef in the Torres Straits. She was refloated but was consequently abandoned off the Great Barrier Reef. Her crew reached Booby Island, New South Wales on 3 July. They were rescued on 7 July by Bato (Netherlands). Elizabeth was on a voyage from Melbourne, Victoria to Moulmein, Burma.
Himalaya	United Kingdom	The steamship ran aground off Yarmouth, Isle of Wight. She was on a voyage from Varna, Ottoman Empire to Southampton, Hampshire. She was refloated on 30 June and taken in to Southampton.

== 29 June ==
List of shipwrecks: 29 June 1854
Ship	State	Description
Harmony	United Kingdom	The ship was driven ashore and severely damaged at Ross, Northumberland. She was on a voyage from Aberdeen to Sunderland, County Durham. She was refloated in early August.

== 30 June ==
List of shipwrecks: 30 June 1854
Ship	State	Description
Ant	United Kingdom	The ship was wrecked on the Whitby Rock. Her crew were rescued. She was on a voyage from Blyth, Northumberland to Whitby, Yorkshire.
Artemisia	United Kingdom	The ship was wrecked on Kangean Island, Netherlands East Indies. All 24 people survived. She was on a voyage from New Zealand to Singapore, Straits Settlements.
John Bull	United Kingdom	The ship was driven ashore at Mockbeggar, Cheshire. She was on a voyage from Poole, Dorset to Liverpool, Lancashire. She was refloated and taken in to Liverpool in a severely leaky condition.

== Unknown date ==
List of shipwrecks: Unknown date in June 1854
Ship	State	Description
Deux Frères	United Kingdom	The ship caught fire in the Mediterranean Sea and was abandoned. She was discovered by Leonidas (flag unknown), the fire was extinguished and she was towed in to Marseille, Bouches-du-Rhône, where she arrived on 26 June.
HNLMS Doggerbank	Royal Netherlands Navy	The frigate ran aground at Smyrna, Ottoman Empire.
En Avant	United Kingdom	The brig sank near Savannah, Georgia, United States before 2 June. She was refloated and taken in to Charleston, South Carolina.
Euterpe	United Kingdom	The barque was wrecked at Byndoor, India after 11 Junewith the loss of three of her 22 crew. She was on a voyage from Calcutta, India to Liverpool, Lancashire.
Harvest	United States	The ship was driven ashore at Sharps Point, Maryland.
Infatigable	Belgium	The brig was wrecked at Arkhangelsk, Russia on 16 or 18 June. Her crew were rescued.
Irma	France	The brig was driven ashore and wrecked near Worms Head, Glamorgan, Wales, United Kingdom.
Isaac C. Green	United States	The steamboat broke in two and sank 100 nautical miles (190 km) south west of Cape San Antonio, Cuba. Her twelve crew took to two boats. Seven of them in one of the boats were rescued by HMS Espeigle (Royal Navy). Isaac C. Green was on a voyage from Havana, Cuba to San Juan del Norte, Nicaragua
Lady Brisbane	United Kingdom	The paddle steamer sank at Ayr on or before 8 June. She was refloated on 10 June.
Liburn	United Kingdom	The brig was sunk by ice in the Grand Banks of Newfoundland. Her twelve crew were rescued by Nicaragua (United Kingdom). Liburn was on a voyage from Newcastle upon Tyne, Northumberland to Quebec City, Province of Canada, British North America.
Mary Shepherd	United Kingdom	The ship was destroyed by fire in the St. Beanard Straits before 7 June. She was on a voyage from London to Shanghai, China.
Mayflower	United Kingdom	The ship foundered in the Atlantic Ocean. All on board were rescued. She was on a voyage from South Shields, County Durham to Quebec City.
Vernon	United States	The barque was destroyed by fire at Mobile, Alabama.
William and Elizabeth	United Kingdom	The ship was driven ashore on Campobello Island, New Brunswick, British North America. She was on a voyage from Liverpool to Saint Andrews, New Brunswick.
