= Archelaus I =

Archelaus I may refer to:

- Archelaus of Macedon (r. 413–399 BC)
- Archelaus of Cappadocia (r. 36 BC – 17 AD)

== See also ==
- Archelaus II (disambiguation)
