= Federico Beltrán Masses =

Spanish painter (1885–1949)

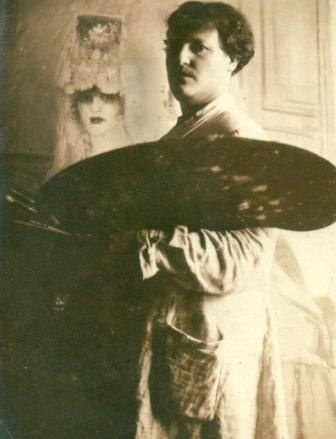
- Federico Beltrán Masses in 1914
- Born: August 29, 1885; Guaira de la Melena, Cuba
- Died: October 4, 1949 (aged 64); Barcelona, Spain
- Education: Studied under Joaquín Sorolla in Madrid, Spain
- Known for: Painting
- Spouse: Irene Narezo Dragoné

Federico Beltrán Masses (8 September 1885 – 4 October 1949) was a Spanish painter known for his rich use of colour, psychological portraiture, and evocative images of women.

Born in Cuba to Spanish parents, he spent his youth in Barcelona before studying painting in Madrid under Joaquín Sorolla. Beltrán Masses achieved significant success in Paris during the early twentieth century, exhibiting internationally and receiving critical acclaim. His work is characterized by Symbolist influences, dramatic nocturnal settings, and a distinctive colour palette known as "Beltrán blue." Despite a period of obscurity after his death, his reputation has been revived in recent decades through exhibitions and scholarly interest.

== Early life and education ==
Federico Beltrán Masses was born on 8 September 1885 in Cuba, the only child of Luis Beltrán Fernández Estepona, a former Spanish army officer stationed there, and Doña Mercedes Masses Olives, the daughter of a doctor from Lleida, Catalonia. His mother's family had lived in Cuba for nearly two centuries. When Beltrán Masses was seven years old, his family returned to Spain and settled in Barcelona. He began his artistic training at the Escola de la Llotja and later moved to Madrid, where he continued his studies under the painter Joaquín Sorolla.

== Career ==
=== Early success in Spain and Paris ===
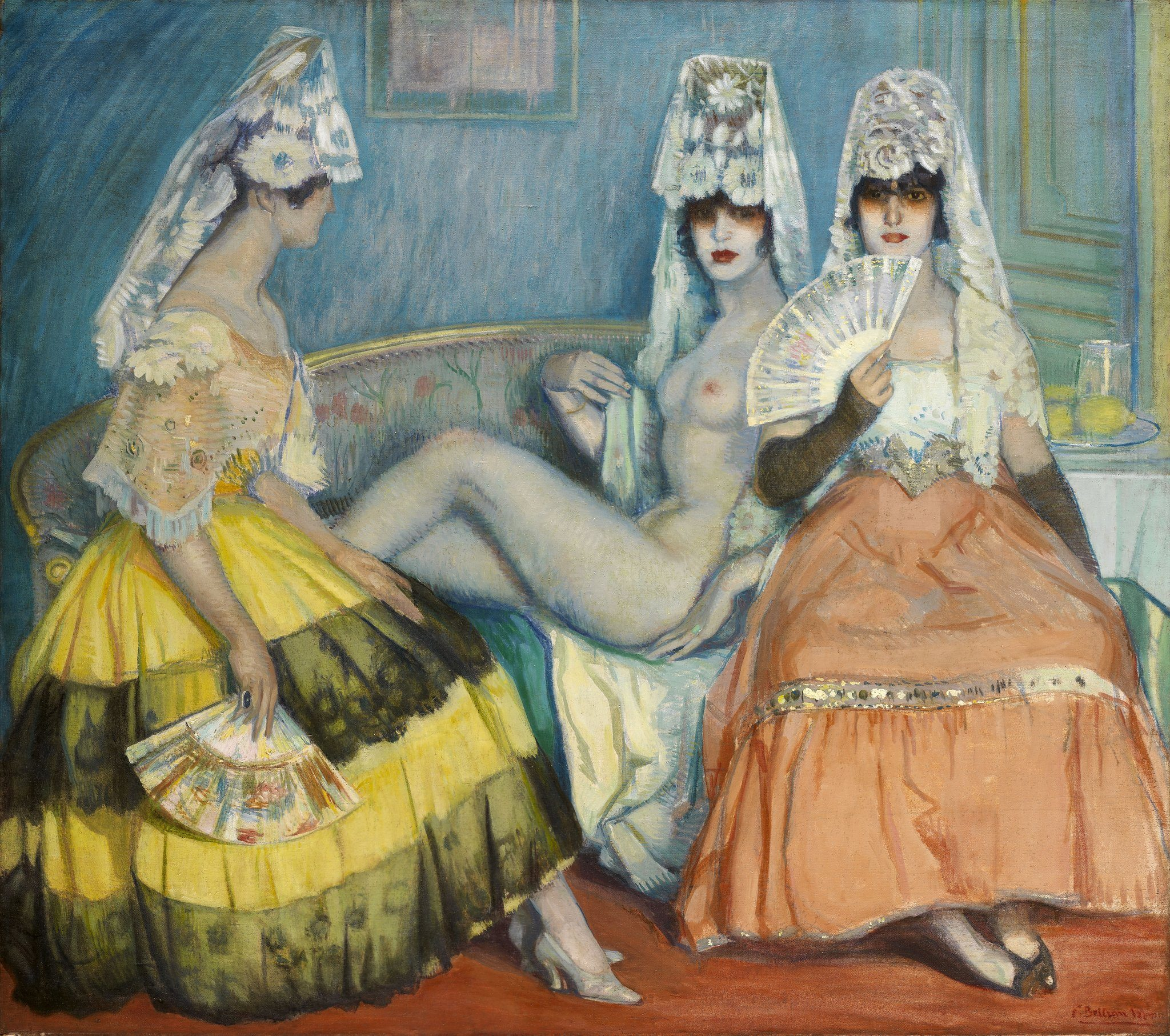
La Maja Marquesa (1915), the painting rejected by the 1915 National Exhibition jury Pintura titulada Miseria humana, realizada por Federico Beltrán Massés en 1904. Óleo sobre lienzo, 190 × 140 cm

In 1904, when he was 19 years old, to convince his father that he was a true painter, he copied Leo Van Aken's painting 'Human Misery' from 1890.

His 1915 portrait of a Spanish countess, seated nude save for a white mantilla between two fully clothed companions (La Maja Marquesa), was rejected by the National Exhibition jury. According to contemporary critic José Francés, the jury claimed the painting might reference a specific marchioness known for scandalous behavior. The jury requested that Beltrán change the title from La Maja Marquesa to Las majas, but Beltrán Masses refused. This incident prompted Beltrán Masses to move to Paris, where he spent most of the next thirty years.

Before departing, Beltrán Masses held a solo exhibition at The Palace Hotel Madrid in March 1916. King Alfonso XIII visited the exhibition, (Note: Alfonso XIII later acquired a work for the royal collection (Noche Galante, Patrimonio Nacional, Madrid).) which featured nearly 80 canvases, including major works such as Demeter, Granada, Dionysus, Invocación a Lakmé, La barca deleitosa, La súplica, Bilitis, Siemprevivas, Intimidad, and Las hermanas. Further successes followed at the XII Venice Biennale of 1920 and in subsequent exhibitions in Paris, New York, Palm Beach, and London, where his work received enthusiastic reviews.

In 1926, Martha Graham titled a dance in her first New York performance "Portrait – Beltrán Masses." (Note: The music was specially composed by Manuel de Falla (1876–1946). A review in Dance magazine described Martha as "clad in a heavy gold kimono, making patterns with her body against a screen of brilliant lacquer—a romantic twelfth-century tapestry in bold colourings... a modern portrait after Beltran Masses." Martha later renamed the ballet Gypsy Dance.) In 1929, the temporary removal of two particularly explicit paintings from a London exhibition provoked controversy but drew over 17,000 visitors within three weeks.

Alfonso XIII's support and a personal introduction by the Spanish Dowager Queen, Maria Christina of Austria, to the Spanish Ambassador, gave Beltrán Masses immediate access to Parisian society. He established his studio in the villa Gilbert on rue de La Tour in the 16th arrondissement of Paris.

His work as a portraitist became an important source of revenue; European royalty, members of the Spanish, French, Italian, and British aristocracy, the wives and lovers of newly rich entrepreneurs, and leading actors and dancers all vied for his attention.

=== Critical acclaim and exhibitions ===
Venice, where Beltrán Masses had first met with international fame, became for him the city of his dreams. The Venice exhibition included several of his best-known works, notably his nude Salomé, which was later to cause a scandal in London. Beltrán Masses' huge success at the 1920 Venice Biennale was consecrated by the inclusion of his Portrait of the Painter in the gallery of famous painters at the Uffizi, leading to a major solo exhibition at the Cercle Interalliée in Paris. Other exhibitions in the French capital were held in succeeding years at the Georges Petit, Bernheim, Charpentier and Jacques Seligmann galleries, and at the Galerie Borghese on the Champs-Élysées.

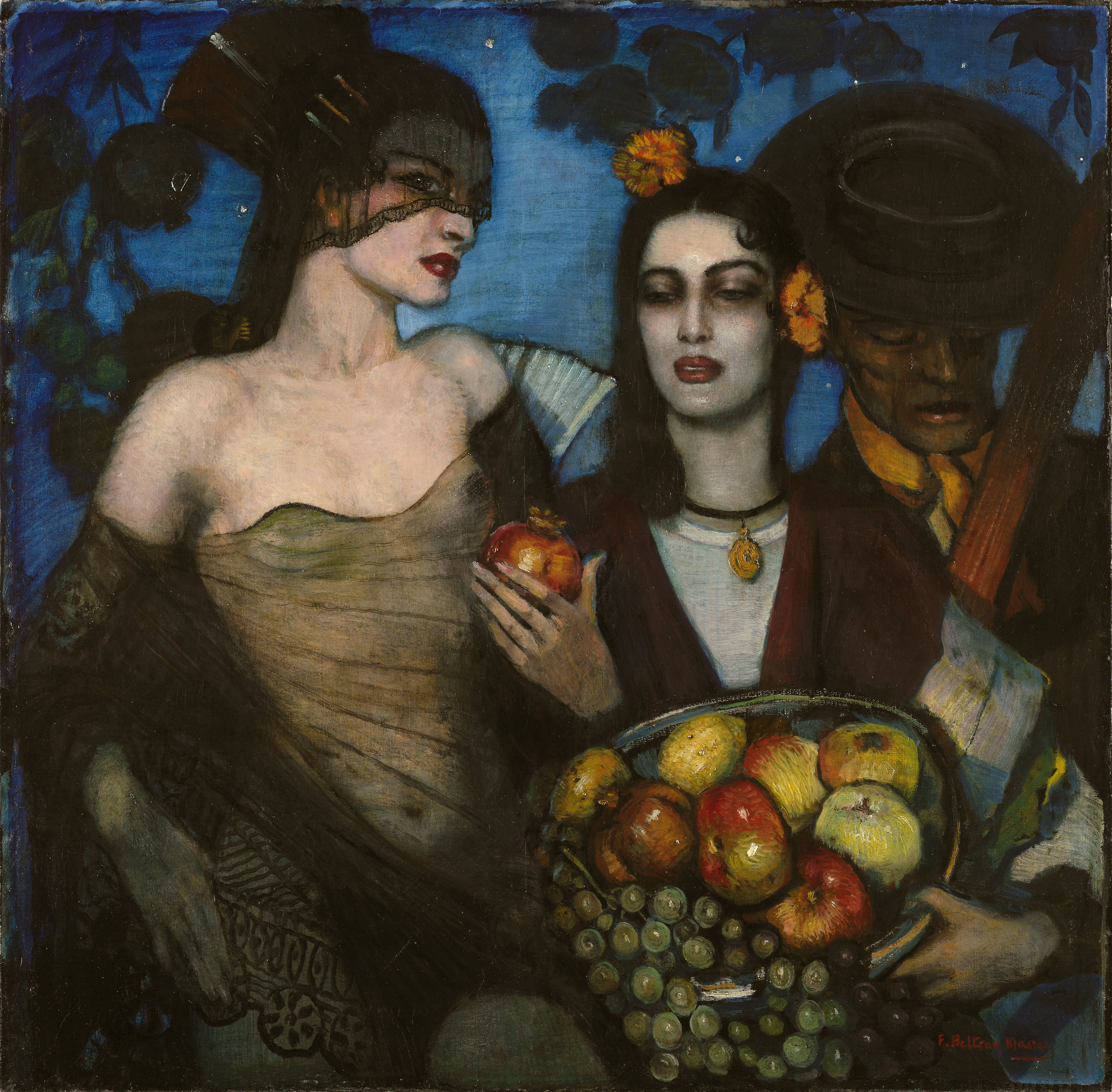
Granada, 1929

Beltrán Masses benefited from the enthusiastic support of the critics Arsène Alexandre (1859–1937), an early admirer of Rodin and Seurat (Alexandre coined the term "pointillism"), and Louis Vauxcelles (1870–1945), who first used the word "Fauvism" and invented the adjective "Cubism". The poet, novelist, and critic Camille Mauclair (1872–1945), an advocate for the Symbolist movement of the late nineteenth and early twentieth centuries, also praised Beltrán Masses. In a letter reproduced by Francés, Mauclair described Beltrán as one of the few contemporary painters who understood the moral responsibilities of art and praised him for creating intelligent work in contrast to what he saw as twenty years of declining painting. Mauclair declared him already a master and stated that no Spanish painter of comparable stature had emerged since Zuloaga.

Vauxcelles and Mauclair wrote lengthy introductions to a 1921 illustrated monograph on the artist, in which five paintings included in this exhibition were reproduced. Alexandre later wrote the introduction to Beltrán Masses's illustrations for a 1929 edition of Il Trionfo della Morte (1894) by the renowned Italian poet Gabriele d'Annunzio, (Note: Gabriele d'Annunzio (1863–1938), created Prince of Montenevoso by the King of Italy, long-time lover of Marchesa Luisa Casati, also painted by Beltrán Masses.) exhibited at the Galerie Javal and Bourdeaux.

=== Reception in the United States ===
Reports of his fame reached the United States by 1921; American Art News mentioned the success of Beltrán Masses' first Paris exhibition. The early twentieth century had seen an explosion of interest in Spanish art, exemplified by John Singer Sargent's El Jaleo and Isabella Stewart Gardner's Spanish Cloister gallery (now part of her eponymous museum) to house it.

Beltrán Masses was later elected a member of the Hispanic Society of America. In 1924, Beltrán Masses was invited to exhibit at the Wildenstein galleries in New York; more commercially successful exhibitions followed in Palm Beach and Los Angeles, both in 1925.

Los Angeles was yet to establish a major art museum, (Note: The Museum of History, Science and Art, the notional predecessor of the Los Angeles County Museum of Art, founded in 1910, had only a modest collection.) and such was the excitement generated by the paintings of Beltrán Masses that the exhibition opened with a lengthy musical programme of Spanish and Mexican music and a reception for hundreds of black-tie attired guests.

The favourable reviews Beltrán Masses received in America and the praise for the "psychological" insights he captured brought him a succession of commissions from American East and West Coast society.

=== Hollywood connections ===
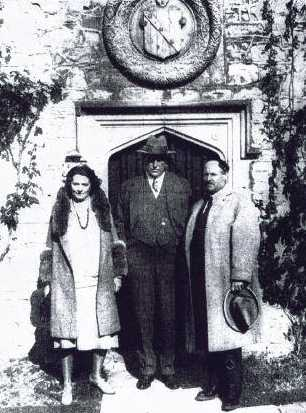
Federico Beltrán Masses with Randolph Hearst and Alice Head at Hearst's St Donat's Castle in Wales in 1928

Beltrán Masses' success in Hollywood and the acquaintances he made through friendship with the actress Marion Davies and her lover William Randolph Hearst (who purchased four paintings by the artist and whose portrait he painted) helped his career greatly. An astute self-promoter, Beltrán Masses made much of his connection to Hearst, with whom he travelled in Europe.

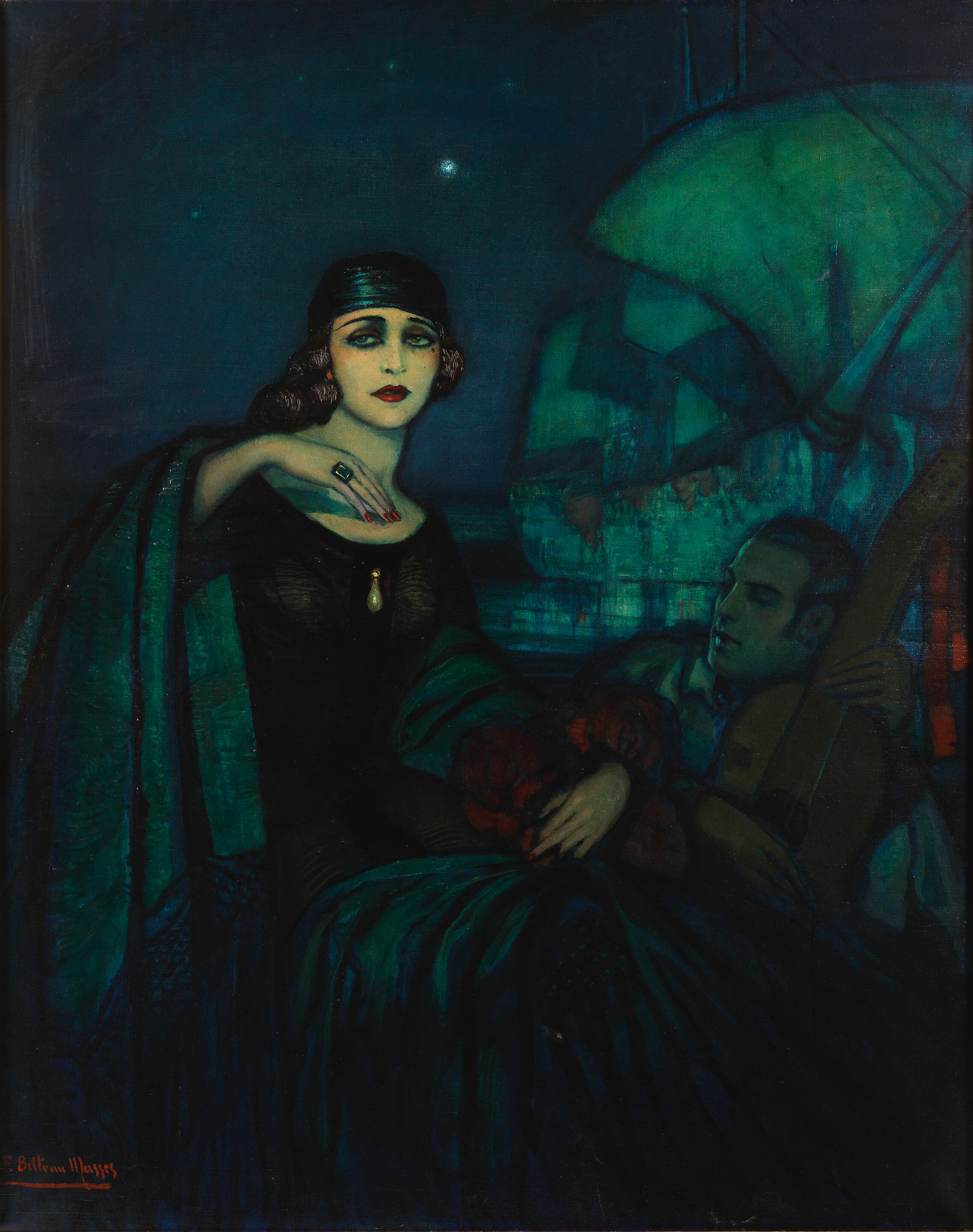
Pola Negri and Rudolph Valentino, c. 1930

Surviving photographic archives show Beltrán Masses with Charlie Chaplin, (Note: Charlie Chaplin bought at least one painting by him, still with the Chaplin heirs.) the Hearst newspaper columnist Louella Parsons, the actress Merle Oberon, screen legend Douglas Fairbanks Senior and his son Douglas Fairbanks Junior, Sylvia Ashley, Pola Negri, (Note: At Negri's request, Beltrán Masses painted a portrait of her with Rudolf Valentino playing the guitar behind her, completed c. 1930. After Negri failed to pay for the painting, Beltrán sued her for $5,000 (equivalent to $96,000 in 2025). At the time, Negri was married to Prince Serge Mdivani, from whom she was seeking a divorce; although a temporary reconciliation delayed the lawsuit, the case was eventually settled.) and Gloria Swanson, whom he also painted, among other Hollywood personalities.

Beltrán Masses painted two large-scale portraits of Rudolph Valentino, each 7 feet 3 inches by 4 feet 3 inches (221 cm × 130 cm). Caballero Jerezano shows him in gaucho dress against a nocturnal landscape; Dawn Le Faucon Noir shows him as a medieval crusader, a woman kneeling beside him.

Beltrán Masses' later connections with French cinema were cemented by the inclusion of twelve paintings and three drawings in the 1934 film, Le Rosaire, staged by Gaston Ravel and Tony Lekain.

Years after Beltrán Masses's brief time in Hollywood, friends such as Davies, Hearst, Fairbanks, and Joan Crawford still visited him in Paris during the 1930s.

=== Later exhibitions and critical response ===
The immediate success of Beltrán Masses' 1929 exhibition in London at the New Burlington Galleries owed much to the art historian and critic for The Observer and Daily Mail, Paul George Konody (1872–1933), who wrote the introduction to the exhibition catalogue and reviewed it for the Daily Mail in a one-page article.

This exhibition – from which two paintings, the Salomé and The Nights of Eve, were initially removed – was a triumph for the artist: eighteen paintings in the show remained in England after the exhibition. (Note: There were over 17,000 paying visitors in the first three weeks, although according to The Daily Chronicle, in a report on 26 May 1934 of the RWS show that year, there were 25,000 in total before it closed, and more than 11,000 catalogues were sold.)

Despite his evident admiration for the artist, Konody avoided being slavish in his praise. While he complimented the artist on his romantic sensibility and brilliant use of colour, he was critical of the occasional contradictions in his drawing.

Beltrán Masses had a second large-scale exhibition in London at the galleries of the Royal Watercolour Society in 1934, but his final public exhibition in London, also at the New Burlington Galleries, in 1938 did not achieve the same success.

Beltrán Masses was a member of the jury for Miss France 1938.

=== Impact of the Spanish Civil War and World War II ===
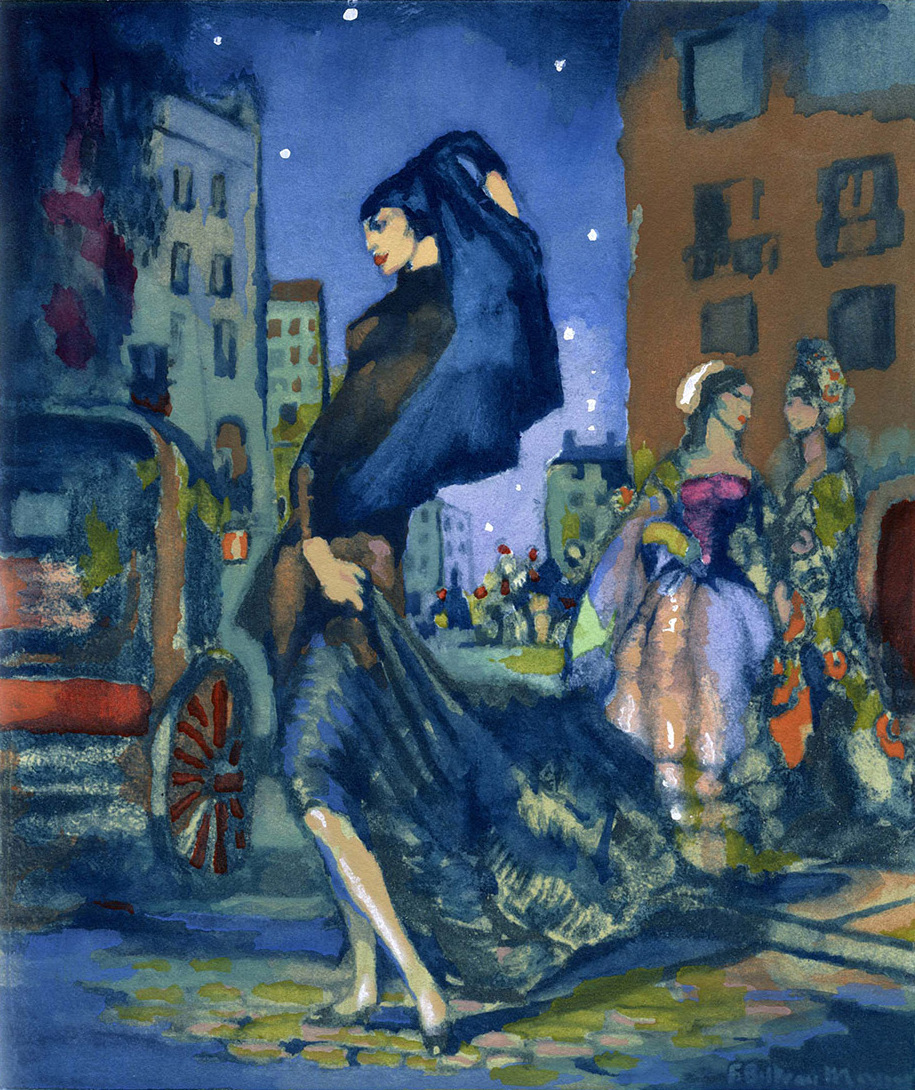
À une passante (Les Fleurs du Mal, Baudelaire), 1946

The horrors of the Spanish Civil War caused the artist great distress. Beltrán Masses was instinctively unsympathetic to the Republic, believing it had destroyed much that he treasured; the support of the exiled King Alfonso XIII had also been an important factor in his early success.

A practising Catholic and a knight of both the Order of Malta and the Order of the Holy Sepulchre, Beltrán Masses instinctively supported the Nationalists, but he was also deeply affected by the tragic consequences of the conflict, having friends on both sides.

He remained in Paris after the outbreak of the Second World War. As a citizen of a neutral power, he was able to live relatively undisturbed by the German occupation. The art market suffered, however, and he was forced to move to a smaller home and give painting lessons in his studio to make ends meet.

When ill health and failing eyesight, which had begun deteriorating in the mid-1930s, required urgent attention, Beltrán Masses travelled to Madrid, but returned to Paris the following year, hoping to resume his career. This proved impossible. Liver disease now compounded his earlier heart problems, and on 4 October 1949, Beltrán Masses died, aged sixty-four.

== Recognition and legacy ==
=== Recognition during his lifetime ===
During his life, Beltrán Masses was showered with public honours and was a member of the Academies of San Fernando in Madrid, San Jorge in Barcelona, and San Luís in Zaragoza, as well as those of Lisbon, Córdoba, and Málaga. He was also a member of the French Institut and the Académie des Beaux-Arts in Paris.

=== Posthumous exhibitions and public collections ===
In 1950, the Lyceum, Havana, Cuba, staged a small posthumous exhibition of his portraits — his first monographic exhibition in the country of his birth.

Two important paintings in the Musée National d'Art Moderne at the Centre Pompidou, and others in the collection of the Reina Sofía, the Civic Museum in Ciudad Real, and the Casa Lis in Salamanca, have offered few opportunities to see his paintings on public exhibition. When the Cuban Museo Nacional de Bellas Artes de La Habana reopened in 2000, two large-scale works by Beltrán Masses were revealed to a public that had no previous acquaintance with the Cuban-born artist.

The Stair Sainty Gallery staged an exhibition of Beltrán Masses' paintings, which ran until 24 March 2016.

=== Revival and renewed interest ===
Beltrán Masses was largely forgotten for several decades, in part due to changing tastes, as figurative painting was abandoned by all but a handful of successful contemporary painters from the late 1940s through the 1970s. Furthermore, many of the artist's more important works remained in the possession of the heirs of his widow. Only when the enthusiastic support of a Barcelona collector resulted in three public exhibitions in Spain — in Salamanca, Barcelona, and, in June–July 2012, at the Real Academia de Bellas Artes de San Fernando in Madrid — was Beltrán Masses's art once again brought to the attention of the Spanish public.

The recent revival of interest in Beltrán Masses owes much to the care with which his heirs retained not only the paintings they had inherited but also an extensive archive, which includes many photographs from the 1920s and 1930s, as well as exhibition catalogues, reviews, and mementoes.

A catalogue raisonné of the artist is presently in preparation.

== Artistic style ==
Beltrán Masses was renowned as a master of colour and psychological portraiture, as well as a painter of seductive images of women. His Spanish heritage deeply influenced his oeuvre, although he sometimes referenced the tropical exoticism of Cuba in the settings of his works. His paintings are rich with musical and poetic references, influenced by "Greek mythology, orphic mysteries and fantasies of Asia, where we are led by Gustave Moreau", remarked Louis Vauxcelles.

An early fascination with Symbolism and "the Ancients" manifested in paintings such as Lackmy and Canción de Bilitis, while his dark, eroticised paintings of languorous women in fantastical nocturnal settings distinguished him from contemporary artistic trends.

=== Music, dance, and the performing arts ===
Portrait of Alicia Nikitina, c. 1929

A guitar featured recurrently in many of his paintings, while his interest in contemporary dance (Note: One of Beltrán's early masterpieces portrayed Carmen Tórtola Valencia; he also painted Florence Walton, the great Vaslav Nijinsky, Antonia Mercé, and Alicia Nikitina.) led to his design of scenery and a gypsy costume for a 1929 performance by the celebrated dancer Antonia Mercé "La Argentina", (Note: For her dance, Sonatina. A photograph exists showing him on set.) whose portrait he also painted.

=== Venice, nocturnes, and the use of colour ===
Venice provided a dramatic and fantastical background for portraits and subject paintings throughout the 1920s and early 1930s. His "beltran blue" color casts the city in a romantic perpetual evening in many paintings, with mysterious figures often only partly lit, while dark shadows exaggerate their features or costumes.

=== Portraiture and high society ===
Beltrán Masses' portrait subjects included kings, princes, Hollywood stars, and high society figures, particularly women who had defied convention and scandalized the public.

In Paris, the coarse Catalan peasants of his youthful canvases gave way to dark-eyed gitanas and recumbent majas, wearing costumes that emphasised their feminine and seductive qualities.

His paintings of women earned him comparisons with the poetry of Baudelaire, and he later provided the images for an illustrated edition of Les Fleurs du Mal. Contemporary viewers were struck by his use of colour and the mysterious, nocturnal worlds in which he set many of his subjects, while sharply illuminating principal figures. He often painted in a darkened room, using artificial light to emphasise the contrast between bodies and their settings. He placed figures against rich fabrics or, following his sojourn in Venice in 1920, in imaginary Venetian settings.

=== Relationship to modernist movements ===
Despite the artistic revolution led by Beltrán Masses' Spanish contemporaries Pablo Picasso and Juan Gris, Beltrán Masses never embraced abstract Cubism, and Futurism held no appeal for him. The realist legacy of his teacher Joaquín Sorolla (1863–1923) was subsumed instead by a mystical symbolism distinctly Beltrán Masses's. In his use of colour and, at times, exaggerated drawing, Beltrán Masses forged an individual and radical identity that concentrated on the psychological. His work bears superficial comparison with that of his friend Kees van Dongen, who, like Beltrán Masses, captured the escapism that characterised post-First World War society.

=== Psychological interpretations ===
Critics in Paris and London noted the psychological aspects of Beltrán Masses' artistic vision; indeed, in 1931, the Paris Revue de Psychothérapie et de Psychologie Appliquée published a lengthy article entitled "L'Oeuvre Psychologique de Beltran-Masses" by Dr. Pierre Vachet, reporting the conclusions of a special conference organised by the French Society of Psychotherapists. The article focused particularly on the artist's use of colour to define the mysterious symbolism of his settings, while emphasising the sensuality and voluptuous femininity of his subjects.
