= Glaphyra =

Princess from Cappadocia

Glaphyra from Promptuarii Iconum Insigniorum

Glaphyra (Greek: Γλαφύρα; c. 35 BC – c. 7 AD) was an Anatolian princess from Cappadocia, and a Queen of Mauretania by her second marriage to King Juba II of Mauretania. She was related to the Herodian dynasty by her first and third marriage, to Alexander, son of Herod and Herod Archelaus, respectively.

== Family and early life ==
Glaphyra was a royal princess of Greek, Armenian and Persian descent. Her father was the Roman ally king Archelaus of Cappadocia, and her only natural sibling was her younger brother Archelaus of Cilicia. Her paternal grandfather was a Roman ally and priest-king Archelaus of the temple state of Comana, Cappadocia, while her paternal grandmother, for whom she was named, was the hetaera Glaphyra. The priest-kings of Comana were descended from Archelaus, the favorite high-ranking general of Mithridates VI of Pontus, who may have married a daughter of Mithridates VI.

Glaphyra's mother, the first wife of Archelaus, was an Armenian princess whose name is unknown and who died by 8 BC. She may have been a daughter of King Artavasdes II of Armenia, son of Tigranes the Great and Cleopatra of Pontus, a daughter of Mithridates VI from his first wife his sister Laodice. If so, Glaphyra's parents may have been distant relatives.

She was born and raised in Cappadocia. In 25 BC, the Emperor Augustus gave Archelaus extra territories to govern, including the port of Elaiussa Sebaste, which Archelaus renamed in honor of Augustus. The royal family settled there, and Archelaus built a royal residence and a palace on the island in the harbor. Glaphyra held the high-ranking title of 'king's daughter', which is reflective of her descent and high birth. She was an attractive and dynamic woman, reputed charming, desirable and a force to be reckoned with.

== First marriage ==
Augustus encouraged intermarriage among the families of Roman ally kings. King Herod the Great of Judaea usually married his children to relatives or to his subjects. However, Herod wanted his son Alexander to marry a foreign princess. Herod negotiated a marriage alliance with Archelaus.

Either in 18 or 17 BC, in Herod's court in Jerusalem, Glaphyra married Alexander. Archelaus provided Glaphyra with a dowry, which Herod later returned to her. The union of Alexander and Glaphyra is described as happy. Glaphyra became a Jew upon her marriage and she did adopt Judaism even though no mention of conversion was made in the account of her first marriage. Glaphyra and Alexander had three children: two sons, Tigranes and Alexander, and an unnamed daughter. The names of Glaphyra and Alexander's children reflect their cultural ancestry and royal descent.

At the court of Jerusalem, Glaphyra made a nuisance of herself by genealogical pretentiousness, citing her paternal descent from the kings of Macedonia, and her maternal descent from the rulers of Persia. She taunted Salome and Herod's wives about their low birth. Glaphyra sneered at Salome's daughter Berenice, regarding her 'with indignation', though they were of equal rank. Her attitude caused Berenice's husband, prince Aristobulus IV to describe Berenice as a commoner, a 'woman of the people'. Salome in turn spread a rumor that Herod was "smitten with love for Glaphyra and that his passion was difficult to assuage". This angered Glaphyra's husband Alexander and alienated him from his father. The women in Herod's court grew to hate Glaphyra and Alexander. Glaphyra's unpopularity led to rumors about Alexander and Aristobulus IV. Herod came to believe that they were plotting against him.

With Augustus' permission, Herod executed Alexander and Aristobulus in 7 BC. Herod also questioned Glaphyra to confirm her loyalty to him. Herod then sent Glaphyra back to Cappadocia, but kept custody of her children. The return of Glaphyra didn't rupture the friendly relations between the two client kingdoms.

== Life after Alexander and second marriage ==
Herod died in 4 BC in Jericho. After the death of Herod, Glaphyra's children came to live in Cappadocia with her. They renounced Judaism and embraced their Greek heritage, including the religion, but their family connections with the Herodian Dynasty were not wholly broken.

In 2 BC-2 AD, the Roman ally king Juba II of Mauretania toured the Eastern Mediterranean with Augustus' grandson Gaius Caesar. During this trip Juba II met Glaphyra. They were married prior to 6 AD. Juba II's previous consort, Cleopatra Selene II, presumably died prior to 6 AD. (Some coins of Cleopatra Selene II have been dated to 17 AD, suggesting she was still alive then; though it is unlikely that the Romanized Juba II would have made a polygamous marriage, his father was polygamous.)

Glaphyra thus became Queen of Mauretania. Her marriage to Juba II was apparently brief: there is no trace of her name in North African inscriptions. However, an inscription referring to her was made in Athens.

Ή βουλή καί [ό δ]ήμος [Β]ασίλισσαν [Γλαφύραν] βασιλέω[ς] Άρχελάου θυγ[ατέρα], βασιλέως Ίόβ[α] γυναίκ[α άρε]τής έν[ε]κα.

The Boule and Demos Queen Glaphyra daughter of King Archelaus and wife of King Juba on account of virtue.

== Third marriage ==
During her second marriage, she became reacquainted with Herod Archelaus (half-brother of her first husband, and now the Roman Ethnarch of Samaria, Judaea and Edom). He was the son of Herod the Great and his fourth wife Malthace. They fell in love with each other and determined to marry. For them to marry, Glaphyra divorced Juba II and Herod Archelaus divorced his first wife, his cousin Mariamne.

Glaphyra and Herod Archelaus were married while Herod Archelaus was Ethnarch. The marriage of a widow to her former brother-in-law violated Jewish laws of levirate marriage. It was considered immoral by the Jews and caused a major religious scandal in Judaea.

The marriage of Glaphyra and Herod Archelaus did not have a happy ending. Shortly after the wedding, Glaphyra allegedly dreamed that her first husband stood at her side and reproached her for not being faithful to him. She had not only made a second marriage but had even come back and married her brother-in-law. In the dream, Alexander said to Glaphyra he would now reclaim her as his own. She told her friends of the dream and died two days later.

About the time of Glaphyra's death, Augustus removed Herod Archelaus as Ethnarch because of his cruelty, and banished him to Vienne in Gaul. It is uncertain if Glaphyra died before or during his exile. Her death reputedly gratified the women of the Judaean court.

== Sources ==
- Ancient History Articles
- Jewish Women a comprehensive historical encyclopedia: Jewish Women's Archive – Herodian Women
- Ptolemaic Genealogy, Berenice IV
- Ptolemaic Genealogy, Cleopatra Selene II
- Eisenman's "New Testament Code", Chapter 4
- Marriage and Divorce in the Herodian Family: A Case Study of Diversity in Late Second Temple Judaism Ingrid Johanne Moen, Department of Religion, Duke University
- Millar, Fergus; Schürer, Emil; Vermes, Geza. The History of the Jewish People in the Age of Jesus Christ (175 B.C. - A.D. 135), Continuum International Publishing Group, 1973
- Temporini, H.; Haase, W. Aufstieg und Niedergang der römischen Welt: Geschichte und Kultur Roms im Spiegel der neueren Forschung, Walter de Gruyter, 1980
- Syme, R.; Birley, A. R. Anatolica: studies in Strabo, Oxford University Press, 1995
- Rigsby, K. J. Asylia: territorial inviolability in the Hellenistic world, University of California Press, 1996
- Salisbury, J. E. Women in the ancient world, ABC-CLIO, 2001
- Sandler, S. Ground warfare: an international encyclopedia, Volume 1, ABC-CLIO, 2002
- Gillman. F. M. Herodias: at home in that fox's den, Liturgical Press, 2003
- Dueck, D.; Lindsay, H.; Pothecary, S. Strabo's cultural geography: the making of a kolossourgia, Cambridge University Press, 2005
- Kasher, A.; Witztum, E. King Herod: a persecuted persecutor: a case study in psychohistory and psychobiography, Walter de Gruyter, 2007
- Mayor, A. The Poison King: the life and legend of Mithradates, Rome's deadliest enemy, Princeton University Press, 2009
