= Glaphyra (1814 ship) =

History

United Kingdom
- Name: Glaphyra
- Namesake: Glaphyra, or Glaphyra (hetaera)
- Launched: 1814, Calcutta (Note: Although the registers show Glaphyra as having been built at Calcutta, she does not appear in the most comprehensive listing of vessels launched at Calcutta. She also did not appear in a listing of vessels registered at Calcutta, Bombay, or Madras in 1819.)
- Fate: Wrecked 19 June 1854

General characteristics
- Tons burthen: 343, or 35479/94, or 370 (bm)
- Length: 100 ft 7 in (30.7 m)
- Beam: 28 ft 9 in (8.8 m)
- Sail plan: Barque
- Notes: Teak-built

Glaphyra was launched at Calcutta in 1814. She came to England in 1821 and thereafter sailed as a West Indiaman. She was wrecked on 19 June 1854.

== Career ==
Glaphyra, Granger, master, arrived at the Cape of Good Hope on 9 December 1820 from Mauritius. She arrived at Portsmouth on 18 March 1821 from Mauritius and Batavia. She arrived at Gravesend on 2 May from Antwerp. (Note: If Glaphyra was carrying a cargo from east of the Cape of Good Hope she could not sell it England without violating the British East India Company's monopoly on trade between Asia and Britain.)

Glaphyra first appeared in Lloyd's Register (LR) in 1821.

Year	Master	Owner	Trade	Source & notes
1821	Granger; Billinghurst	Granger; Manning & Co.	London–Calcutta; London–Antigua	LR
1823	Billinghurst; Morton	Manning & Co.	London–Antigua	LR
1826	Morton; Sowell (or Sewell)	Manning & Co.	London–Antigua	LR
1832	Sewell; Thomas; Pearson	Manning	London–Antigua	LR
1833	Pearson	Billinghurst	London–Antigua	LR
1834	T.Pearson; R.Morton	Billinghurst	London–Antigua	LR
1835	R.Morton	Billinghurst; Manning	London–Antigua	LR

On 19 June 1838 Glaphyra was on her way from Antigua to London to Antigua when she encountered a hurricane at 28°N 57°W. Her ground tier was washed out and she had six feet of water in her hold. She became too unstable to carry her topmasts. She arrived at Deal on 20 July, towed by a steamer. By 1 September she was cleared outbound for Antigua with cargo.

Year	Master	Owner	Trade	Source & notes
1839	R.Morton; Quelch	Manning	London–Antigua	LR
1840	J.Quelch	Manning	London; London–St Kitts	LR; damages repaired 1838
1851	J.Quelch; Leonard	Manning	London–St Kitts	LR; damages repaired 1838 & small repairs 1846
1854	Leonard	Manning	London–West Indies	LR; small repairs 1846 & 1852

== Fate ==
On 19 June 1854 Glaphyra wrecked on the east point of Nevis. She was on a voyage from London to Saint Kitts. Her cargo was saved, but had suffered damage. The hull, cargo, and stores were sold.
