= Salome =

Daughter of Philip Herod II and Herodias

- Queen consort of Armenia Minor
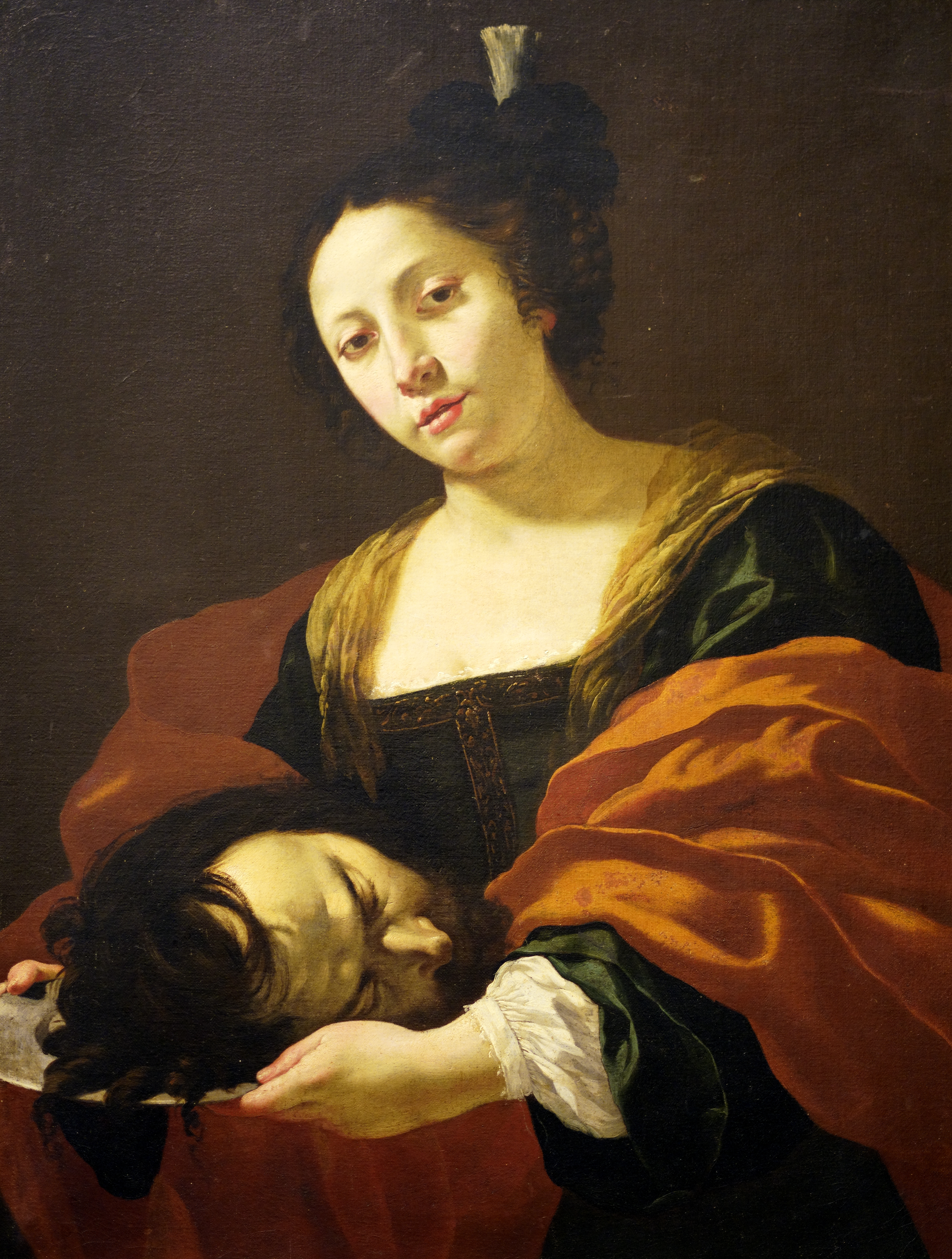
- Salome with John the Baptist's head, by Charles Mellin (1597–1649)
- Born: c.0014 Ituraea, Syria
- Spouse: Herod Philip II; Aristobulus of Chalcis
- Issue: Herod; Agrippa; Aristobulus
- Dynasty: Herodian
- Father: Herod Philip I
- Mother: Herodias

Salome (/səˈloʊmi, ˈsæləmeɪ/; Hebrew: שְלוֹמִית, romanized: Shlomit, related to שָׁלוֹם, Shalom "peace"; Greek: Σαλώμη), also known as Salome III, (Note: In Herodian dynasty, there were three women named Salome: Salome I, sister of Herod the Great, Salome II, daughter of Herod the Great, and Salome III, daughter of Herodias.) was a Jewish princess, the daughter of Herod II and princess Herodias. She was a granddaughter of Herod the Great and the stepdaughter of Herod Antipas. She is known from the New Testament, where she is not named, and from an account by the Roman Jewish historian Josephus. In the New Testament, she is known as the stepdaughter of Herod Antipas who demands and receives the head of John the Baptist. According to Josephus, she was first married to her uncle Philip the Tetrarch, after whose death in AD 34, she married her cousin Aristobulus of Chalcis, thus becoming queen of Armenia Minor.

The gospel story of her dance at the birthday celebration of her stepfather, who had John the Baptist beheaded at her mother's request, inspired art, literature and music over an extended period of time. Among the paintings are those by Titian and Gustave Moreau. Oscar Wilde's 1891 eponymous play and its 1905 operatic setting by Richard Strauss are among the literary and musical realisations which portrayed her. She has also appeared in film depictions, for instance in the 1953 film Salome starring Rita Hayworth.

Salomé with the head of John the Baptist,Wilhelm von Schadow (1838)

== First-century accounts and sources ==
Salome is commonly identified with the daughter of Herodias who, according to accounts in the Gospel of Mark and the Gospel of Matthew, danced for Herod Antipas. In his Jewish Antiquities, Josephus mentions marriages and children of the daughter of Herodias named Salome.

=== New Testament ===
According to the Gospel of Mark, Herodias bore a grudge against John the Baptist for stating that Herod's marriage to her was unlawful. Herodias's daughter danced before Herod at his birthday celebration, and in return she was told she could ask for anything. After consulting with her mother, the girl asked for the head of John.

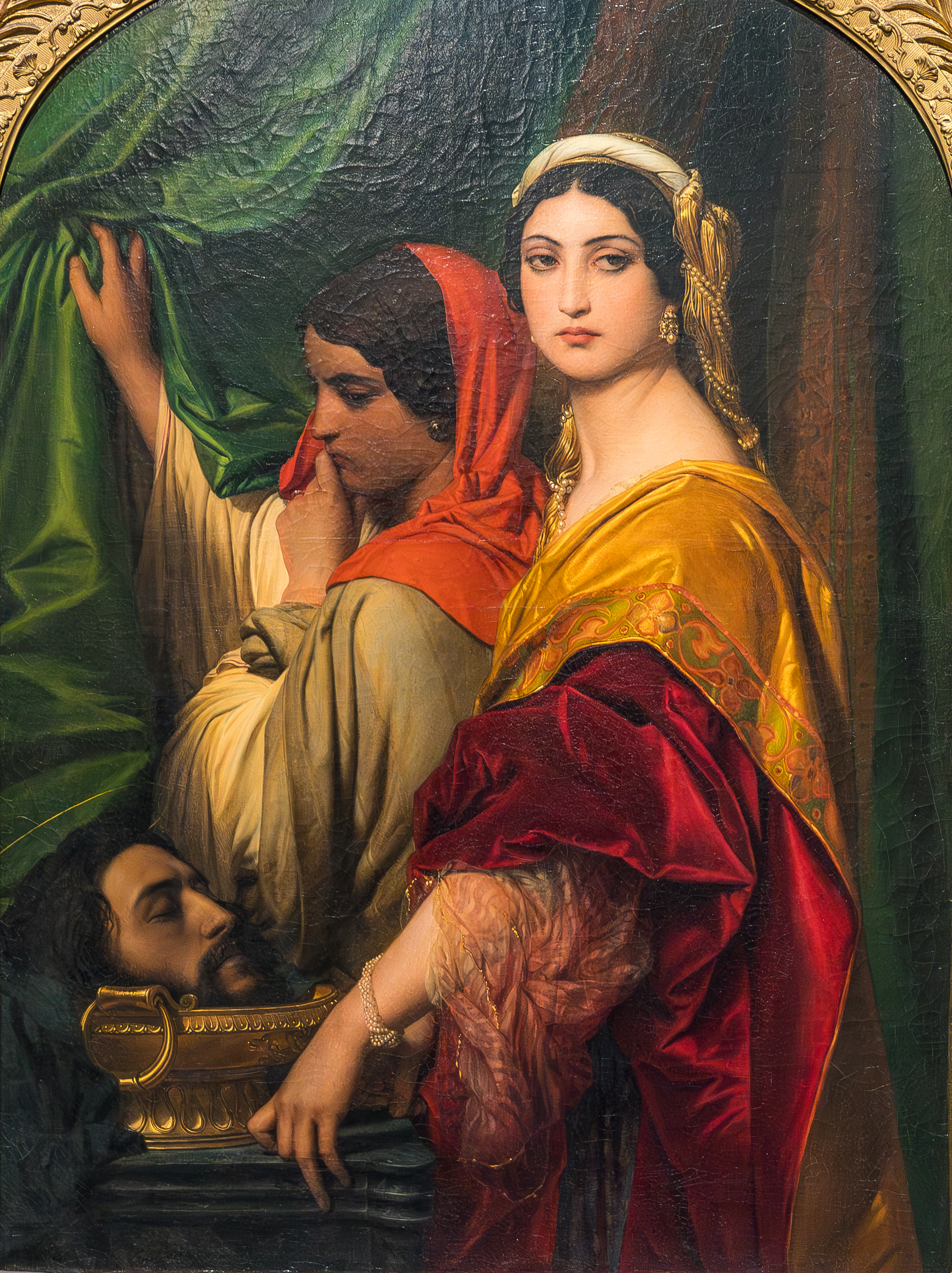
Herodias by Paul Delaroche (1843), oil on canvas. Collection of the Wallraf-Richartz-Museum, Cologne.

The account in the Gospel of Mark reads:

But an opportunity came when Herod on his birthday gave a banquet for his nobles and military commanders and the leading men of Galilee. For when Herodias's daughter came in and danced, she pleased Herod and his guests. And the king said to the girl, "Ask me for whatever you wish, and I will give it to you." And he vowed to her, "Whatever you ask me, I will give you, up to half of my kingdom." And she went out and said to her mother, "For what should I ask?" And she said, "The head of John the Baptist." And she came in immediately with haste to the king and asked, saying, "I want you to give me at once the head of John the Baptist on a platter." And the king was exceedingly sorry, but because of his oaths and his guests he did not want to break his word to her. And immediately the king sent an executioner with orders to bring John's head. He went and beheaded him in the prison and brought his head on a platter and gave it to the girl, and the girl gave it to her mother.

Salome with the Head of John the Baptist by Massimo Stanzione (c. 1630–1640), Manchester Art Gallery.

The parallel passage in the Gospel of Matthew reads:

But when Herod's birthday came, the daughter of Herodias danced before the company and pleased Herod, so that he promised with an oath to give her whatever she might ask. Prompted by her mother, she said, "Give me the head of John the Baptist here on a platter." And the king was sorry, but because of his oaths and his guests he commanded it to be given. He sent and had John beheaded in the prison, and his head was brought on a platter and given to the girl, and she brought it to her mother.

Some ancient Greek versions of Mark read "Herod's daughter Herodias" (rather than "daughter of the said Herodias"). To scholars using these ancient texts, both mother and daughter had the same name. However, the Latin Vulgate Bible translates the passage as it is above, and western Church Fathers therefore tended to refer to Salome as "Herodias's daughter" or just "the girl". Because she is otherwise unnamed in the Bible, the idea that both mother and daughter were named Herodias gained some currency in early modern Europe. The New Revised Standard Version follows this, translating Mark 6:22 as "When his daughter Herodias[a] came in and danced, she pleased Herod and his guests; and the king said to the girl, 'Ask me for whatever you wish, and I will give it'", with a footnote: "[a] Other ancient authorities read 'the daughter of Herodias herself'".

Herodias's daughter is not Salome the disciple, who is a witness to the crucifixion of Jesus in Mark 15:40. However, the apocryphal Book of the Resurrection of Christ, pseudonymically attributed to the apostle Bartholomew, names a "Salome the temptress" as among the women who went to the empty tomb, perhaps reflecting an early tradition that Salome, the daughter of Herodias, was at the tomb.

=== Josephus ===
Salome is mentioned as a stepdaughter of Herod Antipas in Josephus's Antiquities of the Jews (Book XVIII, Chapter 5, 4):

Herodias [...] was married to Herod, (Note: Herod, son of Herod the Great and Mariamne, first husband of Herodias: Herod Philip (I), a.k.a. Herod II) the son of Herod the Great, who was born of Mariamne, the daughter of Simon the high priest, who had a daughter, Salome; after whose birth Herodias took upon her to confound the laws of our country, and divorced herself from her husband while he was alive, and was married to Herod, her husband's brother by the father's side, he was tetrarch of Galilee; but her daughter Salome was married to Philip, (Note: Philip, tetrarch of (Ituraea and) Trachonitis, son of Herod (the Great), first husband of Salome: Philip the Tetrarch) the son of Herod, and tetrarch of Trachonitis; and as he died childless, Aristobulus, (Note: Aristobulus, son of Herod (of Chalcis), second husband of Salome: Aristobulus of Chalcis) the son of Herod, (Note: Herod, brother of (Herod) Agrippa, father of Aristobulus (of Chalcis): Herod of Chalcis) the brother of Agrippa, married her; they had three sons, Herod, Agrippa, and Aristobulus;

According to William Smith's Dictionary of Greek and Roman Antiquities:

A tradition based on Joseph situates her birth in the Spanish city of Italica and her death in Lleida.

=== Coins ===
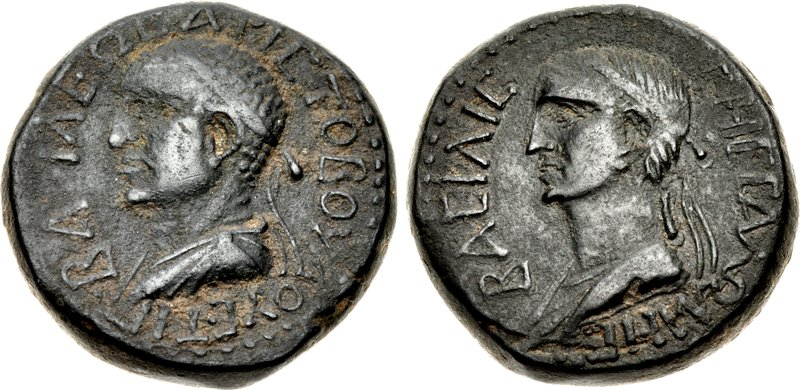
Salome depicted as Queen of Armenia Minor, on the right. On the left, her husband Aristobulus.

A few coins with portraits of both Aristobulus and Salome have been found.

== Depictions in art and media ==
Salome by Polydore Beaufaux (before 1905), oil on canvas. Permanent collection of the Royal Museum of Fine Arts Antwerp (KMSKA).

The story of her dance before Herod with the head of John the Baptist on a platter led medieval Christian artists to depict her as the personification of the lascivious woman, a temptress who lures men away from salvation.

Christian traditions depict her as an icon of dangerous female seductiveness, notably in regard to the dance mentioned in the New Testament, which is thought to have had an erotic element to it, and in some later transformations it has further been iconized as the Dance of the Seven Veils. Other elements of Christian tradition concentrate on her lighthearted and cold foolishness that, according to the gospels, led to John's death. David Flusser, a scholar of early Christianity, believes that her "biographical profile suggests a normal, moral personality". Nevertheless, a similar motif was struck by Oscar Wilde in his Salome, in which she plays a femme fatale, and by Ada L. Harris in her 1906 novel "The Sin Of Salome", who casts her as a predatory vampire seductress. This parallel representation of the Christian iconography, made even more memorable by Richard Strauss' opera based on Wilde's work, is as consistent with Josephus' account as the traditional Christian depiction; however, according to the Romanized Jewish historian, Salome lived long enough to marry twice and raise several children. Few literary accounts elaborate the biographical data given by Josephus.

Despite Josephus' account, she was not consistently called Salome until the 19th century when Gustave Flaubert (following Josephus) referred to her as "Salome" in his short story "Herodias".

=== Painting and sculpture ===
This biblical story has long been a favorite of painters. Painters who have done notable representations of Salome include Masolino da Panicale, Filippo Lippi, Benozzo Gozzoli, Leonardo da Vinci followers Andrea Solario and Bernardino Luini, Lucas Cranach the Elder, Titian, Caravaggio, Guido Reni, Fabritius, Henri Regnault, Georges Rochegrosse, Gustave Moreau, Jean-Jacques Henner, Lovis Corinth, Federico Beltran-Masses and Henry Ossawa Tanner.

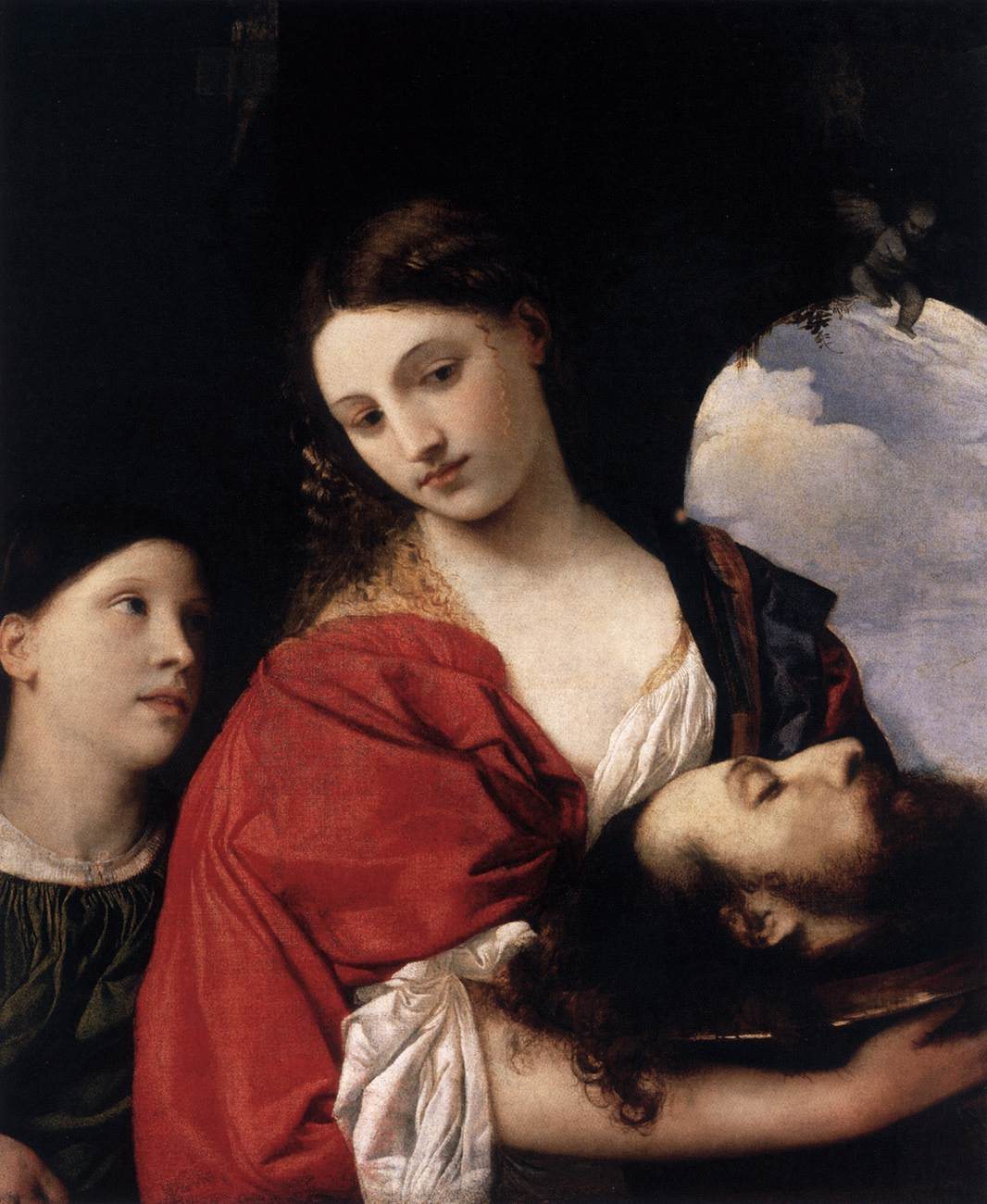
Salome by Titian, c. 1515 (Galleria Doria Pamphilj, Rome)

Titian's version (illustration c.1515) emphasizes the contrast between the innocent girlish face and the brutally severed head. Because of the maid by her side, this Titian painting, like others of the subject, is also considered to be Judith with the Head of Holofernes. Unlike Salome who goes nameless in the Christian bible, Judith is a Judeo-Christian mythical patriot whose story is perhaps less psychological and as she was a widow, may not be particularly girlish nor innocent in representations.

In Moreau's version (illustration) the figure of Salome is emblematic of the femme fatale, a fashionable trope of fin-de-siecle decadence. In his 1884 novel À rebours, Frenchman Joris-Karl Huysmans describes the depiction of Salome in Moreau's painting:

No longer was she merely the dancing-girl who extorts a cry of lust and concupiscence from an old man by the lascivious contortions of her body; who breaks the will, masters the mind of a King by the spectacle of her quivering bosoms, heaving belly and tossing thighs; she was now revealed in a sense as the symbolic incarnation of world-old Vice, the goddess of immortal Hysteria, the Curse of Beauty supreme above all other beauties by the cataleptic spasm that stirs her flesh and steels her muscles, – a monstrous Beast of the Apocalypse, indifferent, irresponsible, insensible, poisoning.

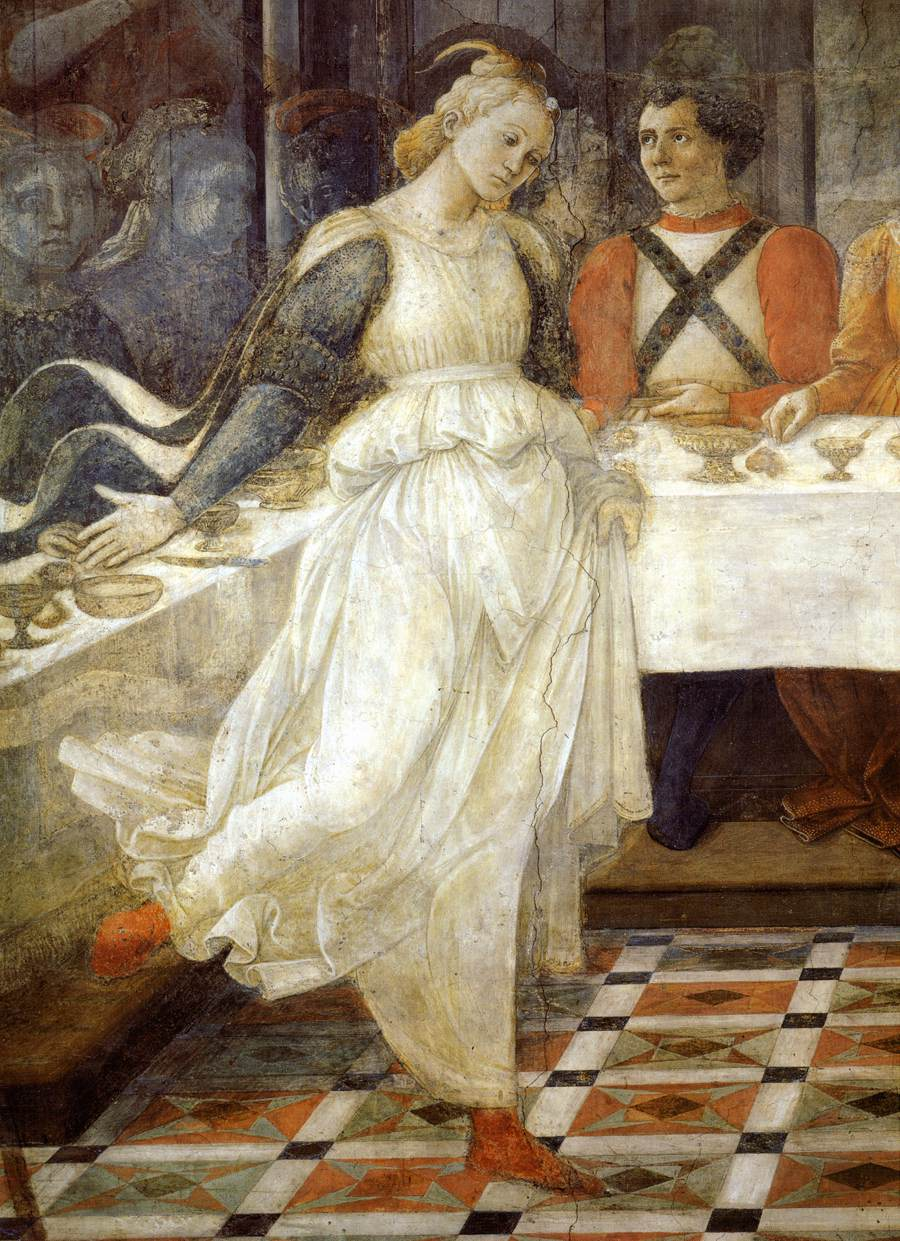
Herod's Banquet (detail, 15th century) by Fra Filippo Lippi

Salome with the Head of St. John the Baptist (c.1630-1650) by Angelo Caroselli

Salome with the Head of John the Baptist (1639-42) by Guido Reni (Art Institute of Chicago)

Salome dances for Herod (c.1655), by Hans Horions

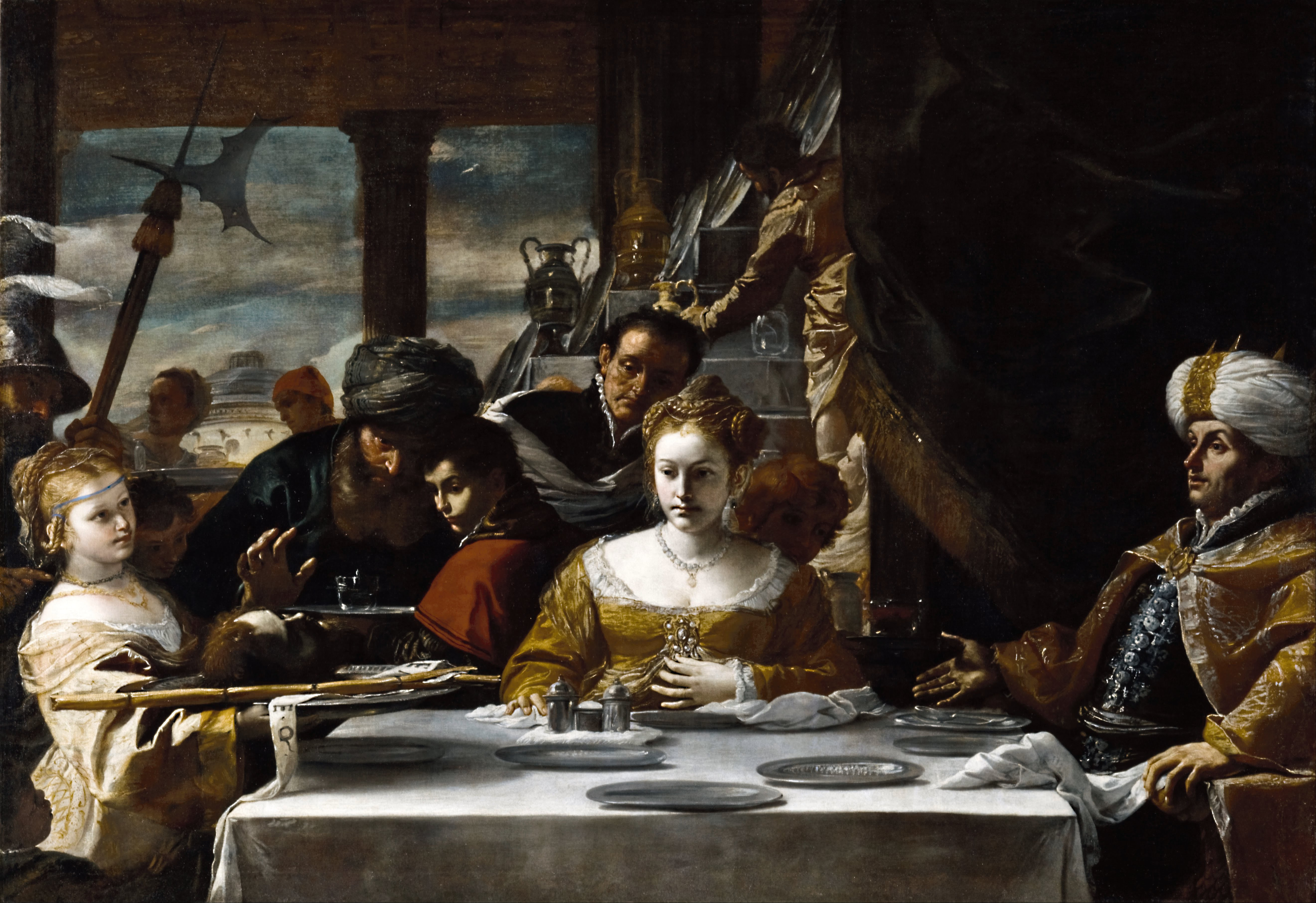
The Feast of Herod (c. 1656–1661) by Mattia Preti, Toledo Museum of Art.

Salome with the Head of Saint John the Baptist (c. 1670s) by Onorio Marinari, Minneapolis Institute of Art.

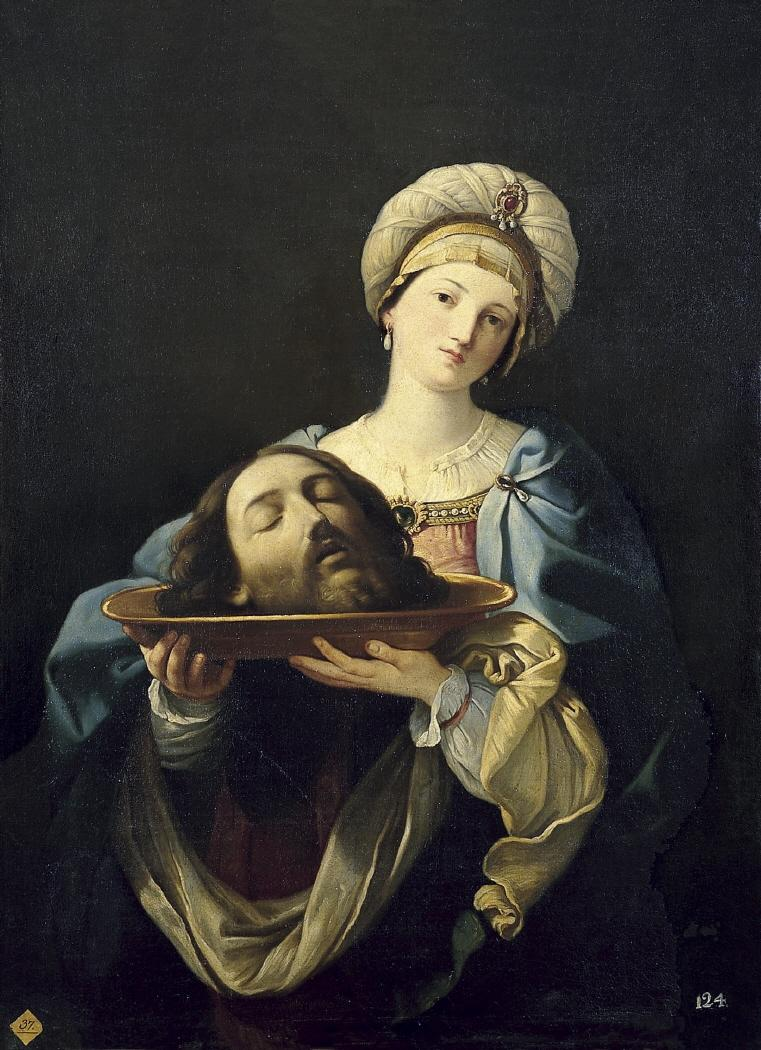
Salome with the Head of the Baptist (1761) by Mariano Salvador Maella

Saint John the Baptist Rebuking Herod (1854) by Giovanni Fattori, Galleria dell'Accademia, Florence.

Salome with the Head of John the Baptist (c. 1861) by Jan Adam Kruseman, Rijksmuseum, Amsterdam.

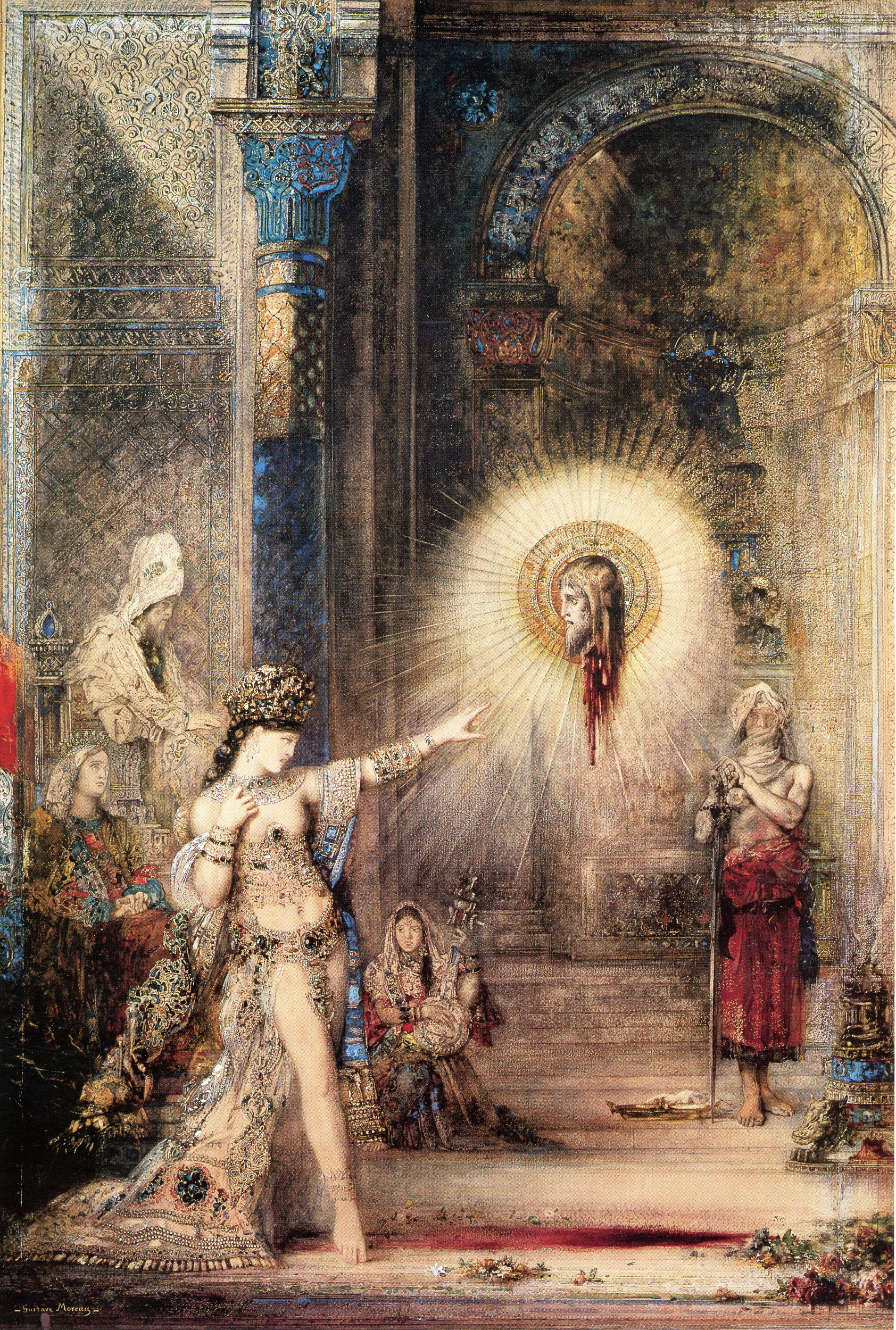
Salome and the Apparition of the Baptist's Head (1876) by Gustave Moreau

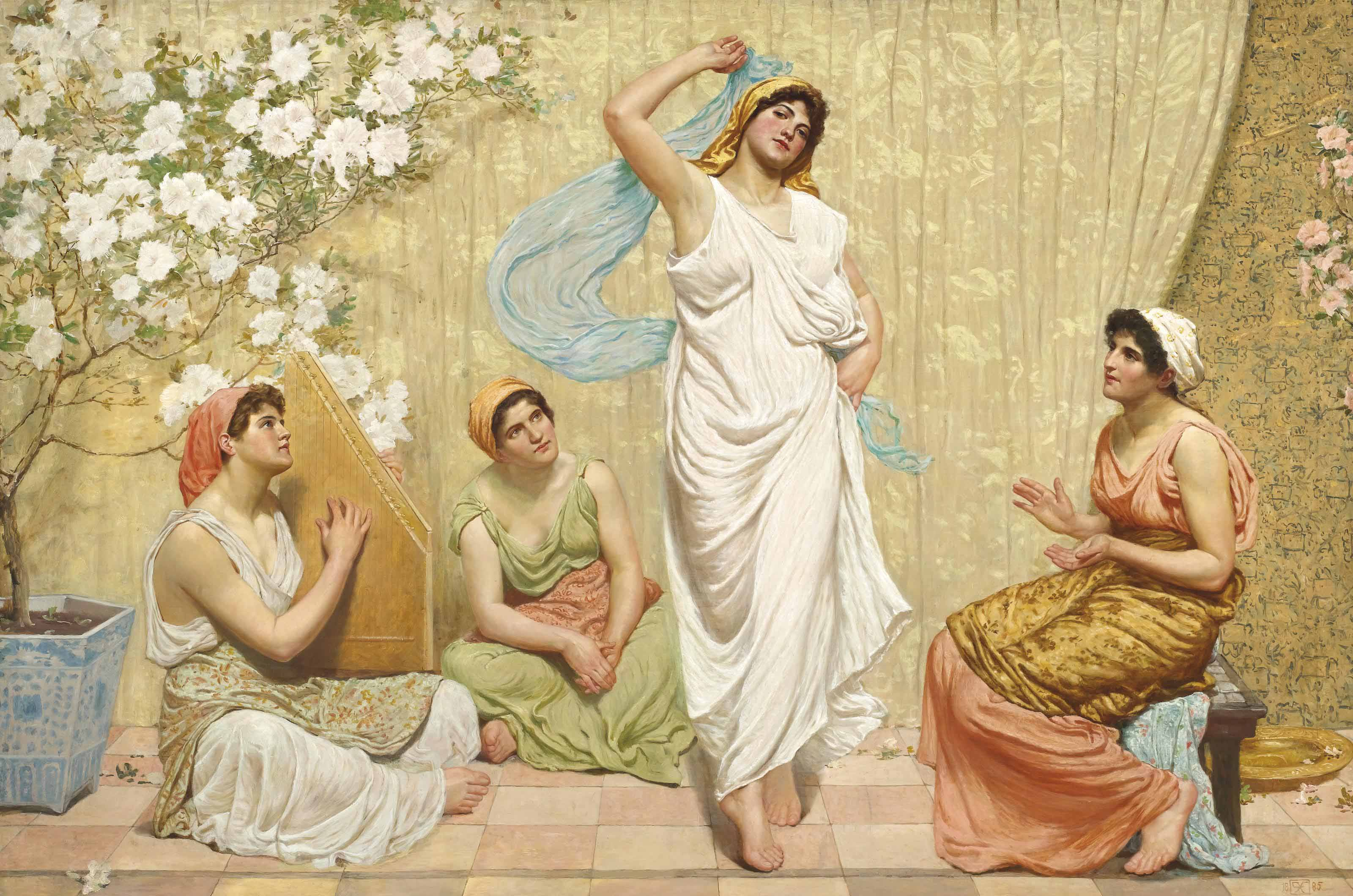
The Dance of Salome (1885) by Robert Fowler

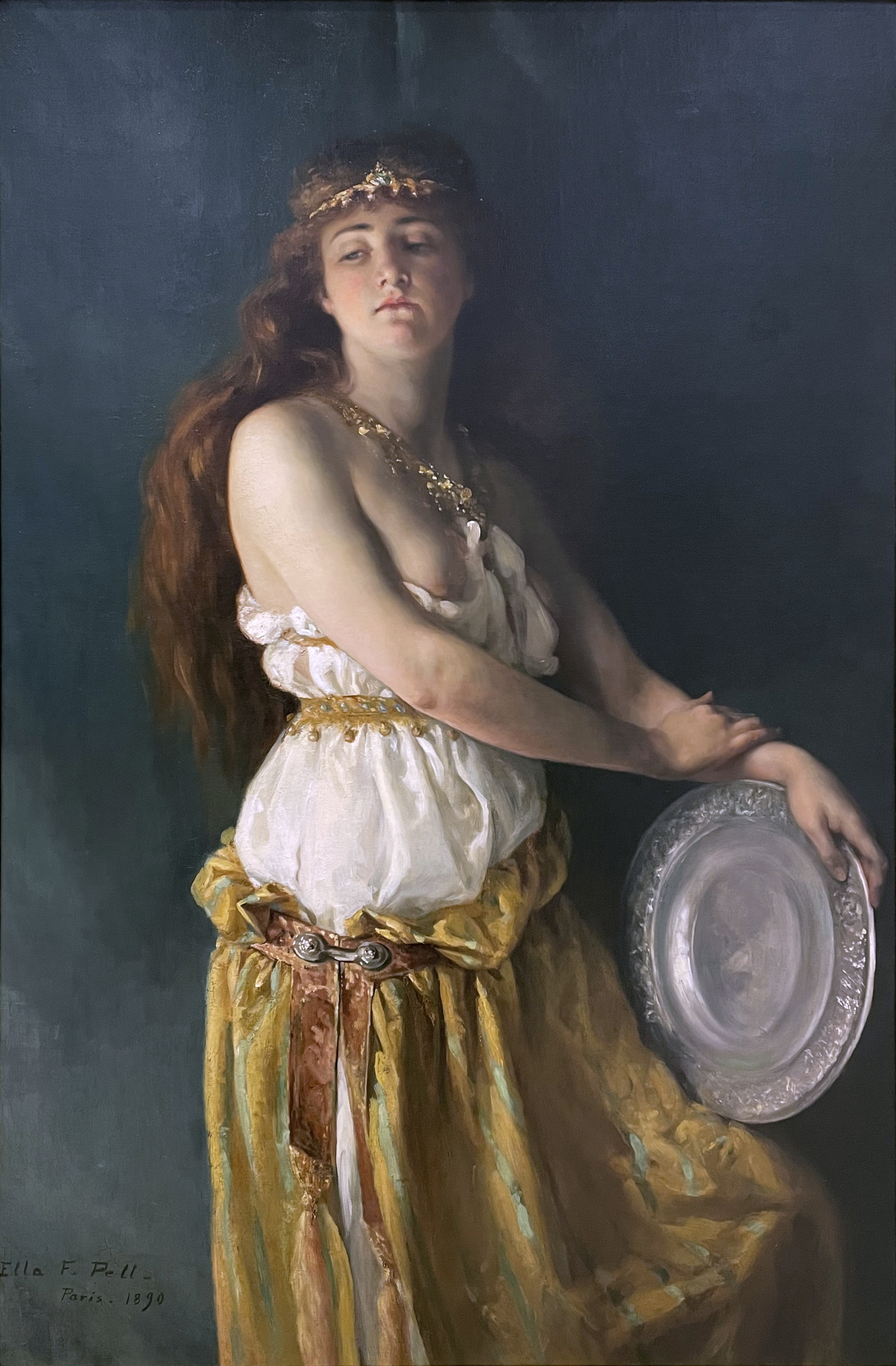
Salomé (1890) by Ella Ferris Pell, Timken Museum of Art, San Diego.

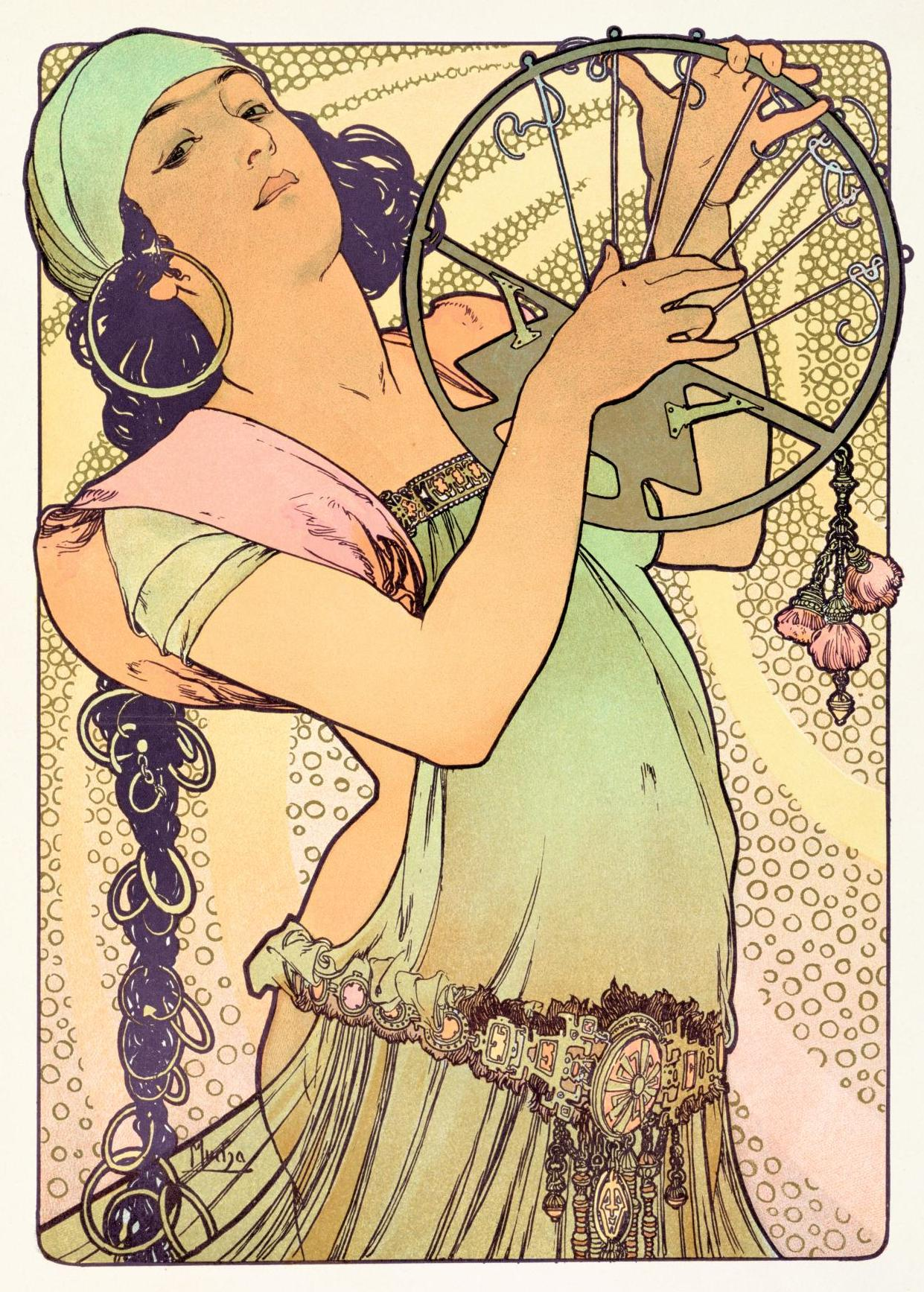
Salome (1897), by Alphonse Mucha, Imprimerie Champenois, Paris

Salome (1912) by Jules Desbois

Salome (1915) by Paul Manship

=== Sacred vocal music ===
Salome appears as a character in Alessandro Stradella's oratorio S. Giovanni Battista (St. John the Baptist), composed in 1676, which includes "Queste lagrime e sospiri", an aria sung by the Salome character.

=== Theatre and literature ===
In 1877 Gustave Flaubert's Three Tales were published, including "Herodias". In this story, responsibility for John's death is given to Herodias and the priests who fear his religious power. Salome is shown as a young girl who forgets the name of the man whose head she requests as she is asking for it. Jules Massenet's 1881 opera Hérodiade is based on Flaubert's short story. Playwright Doric Wilson created a modern retelling of the Salome story in Now She Dances!, first produced off-off-Broadway at the Caffe Cino in 1961.

==== Oscar Wilde's play ====
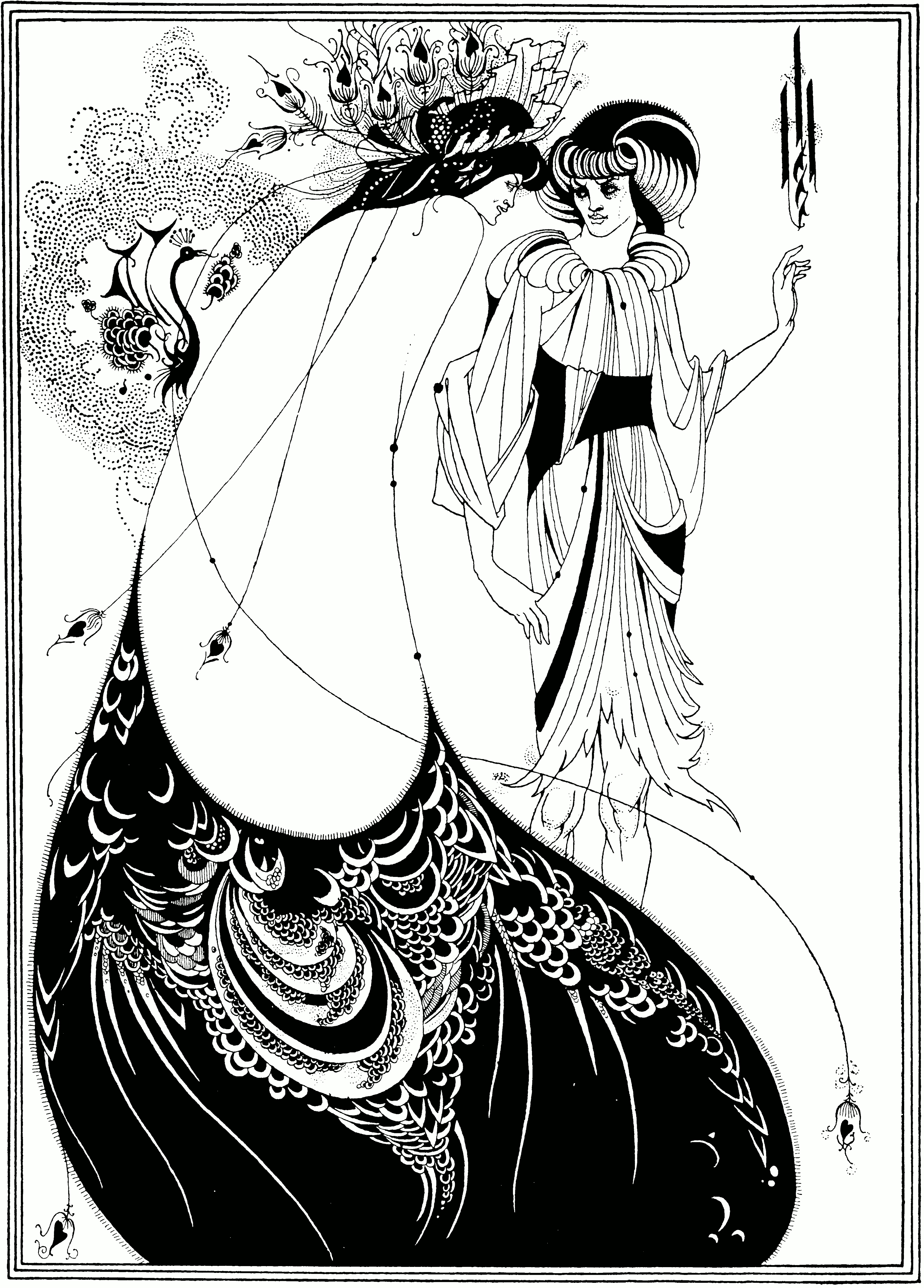
The Peacock Skirt, illustration by Aubrey Beardsley for the English edition of Oscar Wilde's play Salomé, 1894

Salome's story was made the subject of a symbolist play by Oscar Wilde that was first banned in London in 1892 while rehearsals were underway and which subsequently premiered in Paris in 1896 under the French name Salomé. In Wilde's play, Salome takes a perverse fancy for Jokanaan (John the Baptist), and causes him to be executed when he spurns her affections. In the finale, Salome takes up Jokanaan's severed head and kisses it.

At the time, British law forbade the depiction of biblical figures on stage. Wilde wrote the play originally in French and then published an English translation by his lover Lord Alfred Douglas (titled Salome). To this Granville Bantock composed incidental music, which was premiered at the Court Theatre, London, on 19 April 1918.

==== Operas based on Wilde's play ====
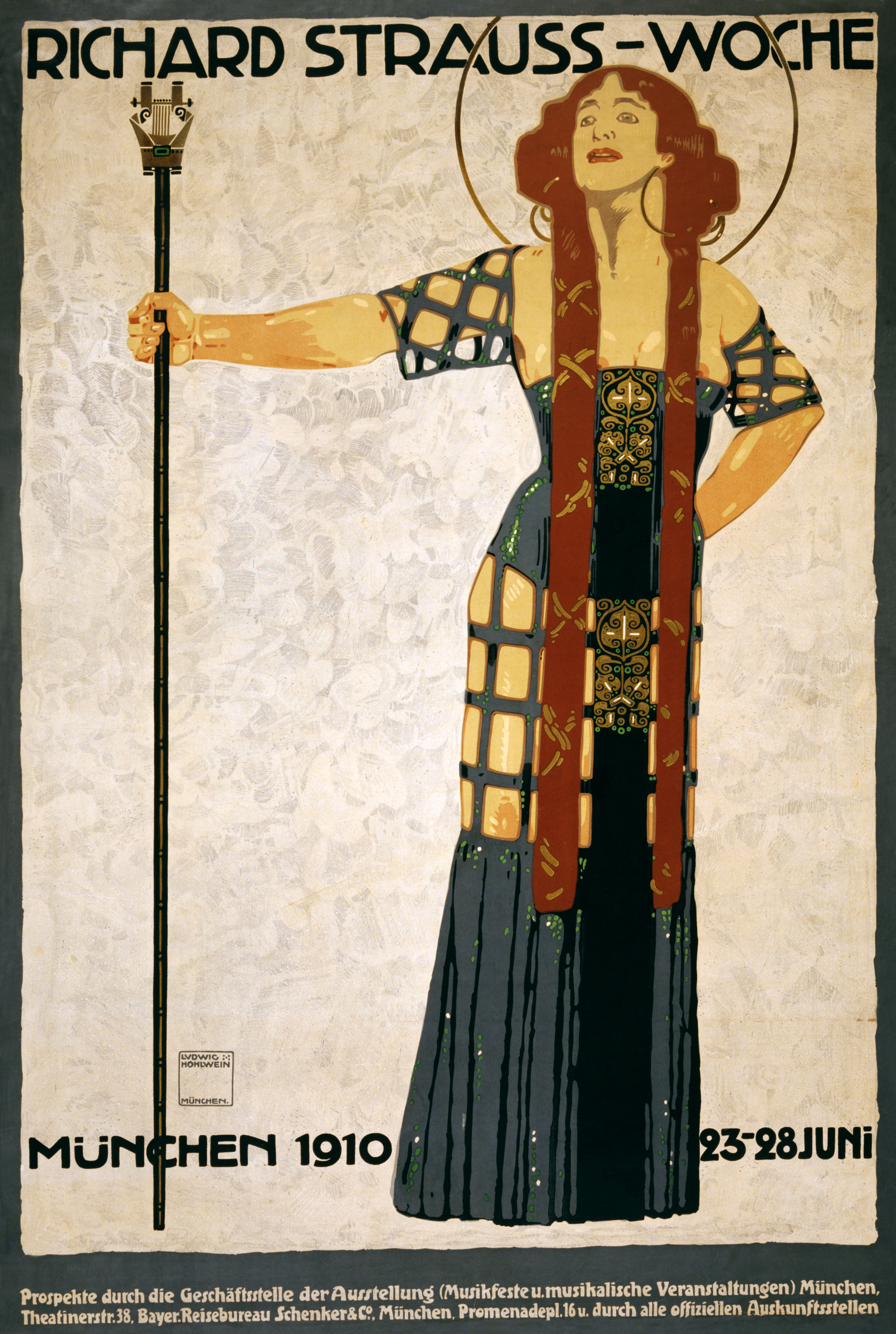
Poster by Ludwig Hohlwein for the Richard Strauss opera, Salome

The Wilde play (in a German translation by Hedwig Lachmann) was edited down to a one-act opera by Richard Strauss. The opera, which premiered in Dresden in 1905, is famous for the Dance of the Seven Veils. As with the Wilde play, it turns the action to Salome, reducing her mother to a bit-player, though the opera is less centered on Herod's motivations than the play.

Shortly after the success of Strauss' opera, Antoine Mariotte created another opera based on Wilde's original French script. It was premiered on 30 October 1908 at the Grand Théâtre at Lyon. This opera was revived only in 2005 at the Montpellier Festival.

==== Ballet ====
In 1907 Florent Schmitt received a commission from Jacques Rouché to compose a ballet, La tragédie de Salomé, for Loie Fuller to perform at the Théâtre des Arts. Another Salome ballet was composed by the Japanese composer Akira Ifukube in 1948. Danish choreographer Flemming Flindt's ballet Salome with music by Peter Maxwell Davies premiered in 1978.

==== Poetry ====
In "Salome" (1896) by the Greek poet Constantine Cavafy, Salome instigates the death of John the Baptist as part of a futile effort to get the interest of "a young sophist who was indifferent to the charms of love". When Salome presents to him John's head, the sophist rejects it, remarking in jest "Dear Salome, I would have liked better to get your own head". Taking the jest seriously, the hopelessly infatuated Salome lets herself be beheaded, and her head is duly brought to the sophist, who however rejects it in disgust and turns back to studying the Dialogues of Plato.

=== Other music ===
A descriptive piano piece by Mel Bonis entitled Salomé (1909) is part of her series, Femmes de Légende. Archibald Joyce composed three 'valses orientales' throughout his career: Vision of Salome (1909), Passing of Salome (1912), and Phantom of Salome (1945).

U2 recorded a song called "Salome" that was included as a b-side to their single "Even Better Than The Real Thing," which was released in 1991.

=== Film ===
Salome (1923 silent movie)
Starring Alla Nazimova in the title role

Wilde's Salome has often been made into a film, notably a 1923 silent film, Salome, starring Alla Nazimova in the title role and a 1988 Ken Russell play-within-a-film treatment, Salome's Last Dance, which also includes Wilde and Lord Alfred Douglas as characters. Steven Berkoff filmed his stage version of the play in 1992.

In the 1950 film Sunset Boulevard, the principal character Norma Desmond is portrayed as writing a screenplay for a silent film treatment of the legend of Salome, attempting to get the screenplay produced, and performing one of the scenes from her screenplay after going mad.

She was portrayed by Jayalalitha in the 1973 film Jesus.

Among the numerous art references in Dario Argento's 1977 film, Suspiria, we can see four of Aubrey Beardsley's illustrations for Oscar Wilde's 1891 tragedy, Salome.

Other Salome films include:

- Salomé (1918), starring Theda Bara in the title role. Flavius Josephus was credited for the story.
- Salomé (1953), starring Rita Hayworth in the title role.
- Salomé (1972), starring Carmelo Bene and Donyale Luna in the title role.
- Salome (1986), a French-Italian production.
- Salomé (2002), directed by Carlos Saura, using flamenco dance.
- Salome (2013), a film by Al Pacino. Salomé is played by Jessica Chastain.

=== Television ===
In Season 4 of Dallas Jenkins' The Chosen, Salome was portrayed by Briar Nolet in a scene depicting the New Testament record of her dance before Herod and request for John the Baptist's head at the urging of her mother, Herodias.

In season 5 of True Blood, Salome is depicted as a vampire and a Chancellor of the Vampire Authority, with the role played by Valentina Cervi. Her lore is revealed in the fourth episode of the season, revealing that she was betrayed by her mother and given as an offering to her uncle, Herod Antipas. In the series, Salome states that she reviles being a symbol of “dangerous female sexuality” and the reputation she received after her mother’s betrayal. It is unclear when Salome was turned into a vampire. She is one of the oldest and strongest vampires in the series, and is portrayed as a religious fanatic.

Salome also appears in an episode of the Japanese Christian anime series The Flying House, in a substantially rewritten, more child-friendly storyline. In this version of the story, Salome is a younger child of about elementary school age who is tricked by her mother Herodias into ordering the execution of John the Baptist, and contemplates suicide out of guilt, but is forgiven by Jesus and ultimately leaves home with her nursemaid, abandoning her life as a princess.

== See also ==
- List of biblical figures identified in extra-biblical sources
- List of names for the biblical nameless
