= Archelaus (father of Archelaus of Cappadocia) =

1st-century BC Roman high priest

Archelaus II (Greek: Ἀρχέλαος Β΄; fl. 1st century BC) was a High priest of the temple-state of Comana, Cappadocia.

== Background ==
Archelaus II was a Cappadocian Greek nobleman. He was the son and namesake of the Roman Client Ruler and High Priest of Comana, Cappadocia, Archelaus I by an unnamed Greek woman. He also had an unnamed sister and his paternal uncle was the Pontic soldier Diogenes, who served in the army of King Mithridates VI of Pontus. His paternal grandfather also called Archelaus, the Pontic General who participated in the Mithridatic Wars. His paternal grandmother may have been a Pontic Princess who was one of the daughters born from the concubine of Mithridates VI, as his father had descended from Mithridates VI.

== Priest-king ==
In January/February 55 BC, after the deaths of his father and sister, Archelaus II succeeded his father as High Priest/Temple Ruler of Comana. Archelaus II was the High Priest of the Roman goddess of war, Bellona. When Marcus Tullius Cicero served as Proconsul of Cilicia in 51 BC, Archelaus II assisted with troops and money for those who created disturbances in Cappadocia and threatened then-King Ariobarzanes III of Cappadocia. Cicero compelled Archelaus II to quit the campaign against Ariobarzanes III.

In 47 BC the Roman Dictator Gaius Julius Caesar after the conclusion of his military victory against the Triumvir Pompey, deprived and deposed Archelaus II of his office of high priest and rule over Comana. Archelaus II was replaced by another Greek nobleman called Lycomedes. Pompey was their family patron and it was he who appointed his father as High Priest Ruler of the temple state of Comana. The fate of Archelaus II afterwards is unknown.

== Family ==
Archelaus II had married a Cappadocian Greek Hetaera called Glaphyra. Glaphyra bore Archelaus II two sons:

- Archelaus Sisines, also known as King "Archelaus of Cappadocia" who reigned from 36 BC until his death in 17 AD
- Sisines

== Sources ==
- Article title
- http://www.tyndalehouse.com/egypt/ptolemies/berenice_iv.htm
- http://www.britannica.com/EBchecked/topic/32710/Archelaus
- H. Temporini and W. Haase, Aufstieg und Niedergang der römischen Welt: Geschichte und Kultur Roms im Spiegel der neueren Forschung, Walter de Gruyter, 1980
- R. Syme and A.R. Birley, Anatolica: studies in Strabo, Oxford University Press, 1995
- D. Dueck, H. Lindsay and S. Pothecary, Strabo's cultural geography: the making of a kolossourgia, Cambridge University Press, 2005
