= Salome (daughter of Herod the Great) =

Daughter of Herod the Great

Salome, also known as Salome II, was a Herodian princess, the daughter of Herod the Great (Herod I) and one of his lesser wives, Elpis, born in ~14 BCE.

She should not be confused with Salome, whose mother was Herodias, and who is alleged to have played a role in the death of John the Baptist.
