= Archelaus of Cilicia =

1st century AD Roman client king of Cilicia Trachea and Eastern Lycaonia

Archelaus (Greek: Ἀρχέλαος; born before 8 BC; died 38 AD) was a Cappadocian prince and a Roman client king of Cilicia Trachea and Eastern Lycaonia. He is sometimes called Archelaus Minor (Minor which is Latin for the younger) and Archelaus II to distinguish him from his father Archelaus of Cappadocia.

== Family background ==
Archelaus was named after the first Archelaus (his paternal great-great-grandfather), who was a general of King Mithridates VI of Pontus. He was the son and heir of the Roman Client King Archelaus of Cappadocia from his first marriage to a princess from Armenia and his sister was the Cappadocian princess Glaphyra. There is a possibility that his parents may have been distantly related. His father was descended from Mithridates VI. His mother may have been a daughter of King Artavasdes II of Armenia of the Artaxiad dynasty. The father of Artavasdes II was Tigranes the Great, who married Cleopatra of Pontus, a daughter of Mithridates VI from his first wife, his sister, Laodice. Thus Artavasdes II was a maternal grandson to Mithridates VI and Laodice. Archelaus was the maternal uncle of Glaphyra's children: Tigranes, Alexander and her unnamed daughter.

== Life ==
Little is known of Archelaus' life prior to becoming king. He was born and raised in Cappadocia and spent his later life at the harbour city of Elaiussa Sebaste. In 25 BC, the Roman Emperor Augustus gave his father extra territories to govern, among them Elaiussa Sebaste. After 25 BC, Archelaus and his family settled there, while his father developed the city, built a royal residence and a palace on the island in the harbour and renamed the city in honour of Augustus.

When Archelaus' father died in 17 AD, Cappadocia became a Roman province and Armenia Minor was given to Artaxias III to be ruled as a Roman client state. The Romans mandated Archelaus to rule, as a client king, Cilicia Trachea, including its maritime possessions, Derbe, Laranda and all the surrounding regions up to Eastern Lycaonia, which all were territories of his father. Archelaus was also allowed to continue his rule over the small Cilician region of Cetis.

Historic sources mention little on Archelaus' life and his reign as king. The main sources are surviving inscriptions from his dominion. In 36 AD, the Cappadocian tribe of the Cietae, who were subjects of Archelaus, rebelled against the monarch because of the compulsion to supply property returns and taxes in the Roman fashion. The tribe withdrew to the heights of the Taurus Mountains aided by the local natural environment, where they held out against Archelaus' troops. For Archelaus to end the rebellion, Imperial Governor of Syria, Lucius Vitellius the Elder, sent four thousand legionaries from the Syrian army, who were commanded by Marcus Trebellius, along with auxiliary troops. When the Roman legionaries arrived at the Taurus Mountains, they constructed earthworks around two hills held by the Cietae leaders, Cadra and Davara. After the Romans had started to kill some of the tribesmen who attempted to break out, Trebellius forced the rest of the tribe to surrender.

Archelaus died in 38 AD, leaving no heir to his throne. Later that year, Antiochus IV of Commagene was restored by the Roman Emperor, Caligula, to his ancestral dominion as a Roman client king and given Cilicia Trachaea. Caligula also gave territories belonging to Archelaus to Antiochus to be ruled as a part of his dominion. When Antiochus and his sister-wife Iotapa became Roman client monarchs over their dominions and Iotapa bore Antiochus their first child, the couple, as a posthumous honour to Archelaus and as a mark of respect to the former king and their distant relative, named their son Gaius Julius Archelaus Antiochus Epiphanes.

== Sources ==
- Tacitus, Annals, 6.41
- J. Vogt, Aufstieg und Niedergang der römischen Welt: Geschichte und Kultur Roms im Spiegel der neueren Forschung, Volume 1, Walter de Gruyter, 1972
- R. Syme & A.R. Birley, Anatolica: studies in Strabo, Oxford University Press, 1995
- W. Haase & H. Temporini, Geschichte und Kultur Roms im Spiegel der neueren Forschung, Part 2, Volume 26, Walter de Gruyter, 1995
- K.J. Rigsby, Asylia: territorial inviolability in the Hellenistic world, University of California Press, 1996
- S. Sandler, Ground warfare: an international encyclopedia, Volume 1, ABC-CLIO, 2002
- B. Levick, Tiberius the Politician, Routledge, 2003
- D. Dueck, H. Lindsay & S. Pothecary, Strabo's cultural geography: the making of a kolossourgia, Cambridge University Press, 2005
- N.G. Wilson, Encyclopedia of ancient Greece, Routledge, 2006
- A. Mayor. The Poison King: the life and legend of Mithradates, Rome's deadliest enemy, Princeton University Press, 2009
