= Archelaus of Cappadocia =

Roman client prince and the last king of Cappadocia

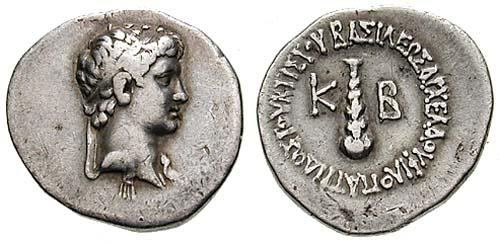
- Silver Drachm of Archaelaus of Cappadocia. The Greek inscription reads "ΒΑΣΙΛΈΩΣ ΑΡΧΕΛAΟΥ ΦΙΛΟΠΑΤΡΙΔΟΣ ΤΟΥ ΚΤΙΣΤΟΥ." Club of Hercules. Year KB΄ = 22 = 15/14 BC.

King of Cappadocia
- Reign: 36 BC – 17 AD
- Predecessor: Ariarathes X of Cappadocia

King consort of Pontus
- Tenure: 8 BC – 17 AD
- Born: Cappadocia in Asia minor (modern-day Central Anatolia, Turkey)
- Died: 17 AD; Rome, Roman Empire (modern-day Italy)
- Spouse: an Armenian princess Pythodorida of Pontus
- Issue: Glaphyra; Archelaus of Cilicia
- Dynasty: Ariathids
- Father: Archelaus II
- Mother: Glaphyra

Archelaus (Greek: Ἀρχέλαος; fl. 1st century BC and 1st century, died 17 AD) was a Roman client prince and the last king of Cappadocia. He was also husband of Pythodorida, Queen regnant of Pontus.

== Family and early life ==
Archelaus was a Cappadocian Greek nobleman. His full name was Archelaus Sisines. He was the first-born son and namesake of the Roman Client Ruler and High Priest Archelaus of the temple state of Comana, Cappadocia and the hetaera Glaphyra. Archelaus' father served as the High Priest of the Roman Goddess of War, Bellona. Archelaus had a brother called Sisines.

The paternal grandfather of Archelaus, also known as Archelaus, was the first in his family to be High Priest and Roman Client Ruler of Comana. His paternal grandfather claimed to be descended from King Mithridates VI of Pontus. Chronologically, his paternal grandfather may have been a maternal grandson of the Pontic King—his father Archelaus, the favorite general of Mithridates VI, may have married one of his monarch's daughters.

In 47 BC the Roman Dictator Gaius Julius Caesar after the conclusion of his military victory against the Triumvir Pompey, deprived and deposed his father of his office of high priest and rule over Comana. His father was replaced by another Greek nobleman called Lycomedes. Pompey was their family patron and it was he that appointed his paternal grandfather to his post in Comana.

== Glaphyra, Mark Antony and accession to the throne ==
Years later, the mother of Archelaus, Glaphyra, became one of the mistresses to the Roman Triumvir Mark Antony. Glaphyra had been a hetaera, a type of courtesan. Glaphyra was famed and celebrated in antiquity for her beauty, charm, and seductiveness.

Through their affair, Glaphyra had induced Antony to install her son Archelaus as king of Cappadocia. In 36 BC, Antony deposed and then executed the reigning king, Ariarathes X, and installed Archelaus as his successor. His mother appeared to possess great political power at the Royal Court. Glaphyra's powerful influence can be demonstrated by contemporary invective, dating from around the time of the Battle of Actium in 31 BC, especially certain sexually frank and famous verses which the future Emperor Augustus composed about Antony's affair.

== Reign as king ==
After Archelaus assumed the Cappadocian throne, his royal title, known from surviving inscriptions, particularly coinage, was: Ἀρχέλαος Φιλόπατρις Κτίστης, Archelaus Philopatris Ktistes, Archelaus, lover and founder of his country in Greek. In his early reign Archelaus married what is believed to be his first wife, an unnamed princess from Armenia, who died by 8 BC. There is a possibility that she may have been a distant relative of his, as she may have been a daughter of King Artavasdes II of Armenia (reigned 53 BC – 34 BC) of the Artaxiad dynasty, Artavasdes II was the father of the future Armenian Kings Artaxias II and Tigranes III. The father of Artavasdes II was Tigranes the Great, who married Cleopatra of Pontus, a daughter of Mithridates VI from his first wife, his sister Laodice, thus Artavasdes II was a maternal grandson to Mithridates VI and Laodice. With his first wife, Archelaus had two children: a daughter called Glaphyra through whom he had further descendants, and a son called Archelaus of Cilicia.

Archelaus was an ally to Antony, until his defeat at the Battle of Actium in 31 BC, where Archelaus defected to Octavian. By making peace with Octavian, Archelaus was able to retain his crown.

When Octavian became the first Roman Emperor Augustus, Archelaus became an important client monarch to Rome, and Augustus considered Archelaus loyal. Augustus had no commitment to provincialization as a matter of policy. In 25 BC, Augustus assigned Archelaus to rule Cilicia Trachea, the harbor city of Elaiussa Sebaste, as well as parts of the surrounding Cilician coast and Armenia Minor. By giving Archelaus all these extra territories to govern, Augustus was able to eliminate piracy and build a more solid bulwark against Parthia.

On the Galatian border, Archelaus possessed crystal and onyx mines. Archelaus transferred his palace from the mainland to Elaiussa Sebaste. After he and his family settled there, Archelaus developed the city. He built a royal residence, built a palace on the island in the harbor and he renamed the city in honor of Augustus. Sebaste is the Greek equivalent word of the Latin word Augusta. Archelaus renamed a village, Garsaura, to Archelaïs, turning it into an administrative centre, which later became a colony under the Roman Emperor Claudius.

Archelaus was an author of a geographical work and had written a treatise called On Stones and Rivers. At some point during the reign of Augustus, Archelaus had a temporary mental illness which resulted in the appointment of a guardian until he recovered.

In 18/17 BC, his daughter Glaphyra married prince Alexander of Judea in an arranged ceremony. Archelaus began to have friendly relations with the Herodian dynasty. Archelaus on occasions acted as a mediator among members of the dynasty. Archelaus traveled to Jerusalem to visit Herod the Great in order to reconcile him with his son Alexander. In appreciation, Herod reconciled Archelaus to the Roman Governor of Syria.

In 8 BC, the recently widowed Archelaus married Pythodorida of Pontus, another Roman client monarch. Pythodorida had two sons and a daughter from her recently deceased first husband Polemon I of Pontus. When Archelaus married Pythodorida, she and her family moved from the Black Sea to Elaiussa Sebaste. Pythodorida remained with Archelaus until he died; they had no children. This marriage linked their kingdoms, and thus both monarchs had indirect control of their spouses' realms. Their marriage arrangement was doubtless orchestrated by Augustus in order to bind together the royal houses of Anatolia as surrogates for Roman suzerainty.

== Tiberius ==
Although Archelaus was liked by the Romans, he experienced less success with his subjects. On one occasion during the reign of Augustus, some Cappadocian citizens lodged an accusation against Archelaus in Rome. The future Roman Emperor Tiberius, beginning his civil career, successfully defended Archelaus.

Despite this, Archelaus gave greater attention to Gaius Caesar, one of Augustus' grandsons and his heir apparent, eventually arousing Tiberius' jealousy. Between 2 BC–6 AD, Tiberius was living on the Greek island of Rhodes, while Gaius Caesar was in the Eastern Mediterranean performing various political and military duties on behalf of Augustus.

By 4 AD, however, Gaius Caesar had died, and, when Augustus also died in 14 AD, Tiberius succeeded his adoptive father as Roman Emperor. By this time, Archelaus' health had failed. By 17 AD, Archelaus had reigned over Cappadocia for fifty years and had lived to an advanced age.

In Archelaus' final year, there was a shortage of funds for military pay and Tiberius wanted to convert Cappadocia into a Roman province. Tiberius enticed Archelaus to come to Rome. When he arrived in Rome he was accused by the Roman Senate of plotting a revolution. Tiberius hoped Archelaus would be condemned to death by the Senate. However, Archelaus died of natural causes before this could occur (Tacitus leaves open the possibility that he may have committed suicide). Cappadocia became a Roman province and his widow returned to Pontus with her family. The Romans gave Armenia Minor to Archelaus' step-son Artaxias III to rule as a client king, while the remaining territories of his former dominion were given to his son to rule in the same fashion.

== See also ==
- List of rulers of Cappadocia

== Sources ==
- Cassius Dio, xlix. 32–51
- Ferrero, Guglielmo (1909), The republic of Augustus, G. P. Putnam's Sons
- Strabo, xii. p. 540
- Suetonius, Tiberius, 37, Caligula, 1
- Tacitus, Ann. ii. 42
- Egyptian Royal Genealogy – Ptolemaic Dynasty, 2005 by Chris Bennett
- Ancient Library Articles
- https://www.livius.org/ap-ark/archelaus/archelaus.html
- https://www.jewishvirtuallibrary.org/jsource/judaica/ejud_0002_0004_0_03938.html
- Millar, Fergus, Schürer, Emil and Vermes, The History of the Jewish People in the Age of Jesus Christ (175 B.C. – A.D. 135), Geza Continuum International Publishing Group, 1973
- A. Wagner, Pedigree and Progress, Essays in the Genealogical Interpretation of History, London, Philmore, 1975. Rutgers Alex CS4.W33.
- H. Temporini and W. Haase, Aufstieg und Niedergang der römischen Welt: Geschichte und Kultur Roms im Spiegel der neueren Forschung, Walter de Gruyter, 1980
- R. Syme and A.R. Birley, Anatolica: studies in Strabo, Oxford University Press, 1995
- K.J. Rigsby, Asylia: territorial inviolability in the Hellenistic world, University of California Press, 1996
- A.K. Bowman, E. Champlin and A. Lintott, The Augustan Empire, 43 B.C.-A.D. 69, Cambridge University Press, 1996
- S. Sandler, Ground warfare: an international encyclopedia, Volume 1, ABC-CLIO, 2002
- A. Dodson and D. Hilton, Complete Royal Families of Ancient Egypt, London: Thames and Hudson, 2004. MCL 932 Dod
- D. Dueck, H. Lindsay and S. Pothecary, Strabo's cultural geography: the making of a kolossourgia, Cambridge University Press, 2005
- A. Mayor. The Poison King: the life and legend of Mithradates, Rome's deadliest enemy, Princeton University Press, 2009
- Chisholm, Hugh, ed. (1911). "Archelaus of Cappadocia s.v." . Encyclopædia Britannica. Vol. 2 (11th ed.). Cambridge University Press. p. 362.

Preceded by Ariarathes X Eusebes Philadelphos	King of Cappadocia; 38 BC – AD 17	Cappadocia is made into a Roman province
