= Glaphyra (hetaera) =

Hetera

Glaphyra (Greek: Γλαφύρα) was a hetaera, a form of courtesan, who lived in the 1st century BC. Glaphyra was famed and celebrated in antiquity for her beauty, charm and seductiveness. Her marriage to Archelaus the elder of Cappadocia gave her political power. Her later affair with Mark Antony occasioned a vulgar poem from Octavian Caesar.

== Marriage to Archelaus ==
Glaphyra was a Greek woman from Cappadocia from obscure origins. Glaphyra had married a Cappadocian Greek nobleman called Archelaus, the High Priest Ruler of the temple state of Comana, Cappadocia. Archelaus was the High Priest of the Roman Goddess of War, Bellona. Through her marriage to Archelaus, Glaphyra became a ruler of the temple state. Archelaus' father of the same name had descended from King Mithridates VI of Pontus.

Glaphyra bore Archelaus two sons:

- Archelaus Sisines, also known as King Archelaus of Cappadocia, who reigned from 36 BC until his death in 17 AD
- Sisines

In 47 BC, the Roman Dictator Gaius Julius Caesar, after the conclusion of his military victory against the Triumvir Pompey, deprived and deposed Archelaus of his office of high priest and rule over Comana. Archelaus was replaced by another Greek nobleman called Lycomedes. Pompey was their family patron and it was he who appointed his father as High Priest Ruler of the temple state of Comana. Sometime later Archelaus died at an unknown date. After the death of Archelaus, Glaphyra remained in Cappadocia with her sons. Glaphyra could be seen as the widow of the dynast of Comana.

== Affair with Antony ==
Years later, Glaphyra became one of the mistresses to the Roman Triumvir Mark Antony. Through her efforts, Glaphyra had influenced and induced Antony to designate and install her first son as King of Cappadocia. In 36 BC, Antony removed Ariarathes X from his throne and had him executed, installing Archelaus as his successor.

Glaphyra appeared to be a powerful lady at the Royal Court and was involved in internal politics in Cappadocia. Her powerful influence can be demonstrated by contemporary invective about the time of the Perusine War in 41 BC, by certain frank and famous verses which Triumvir Octavian composed about Antony. Antony had fallen in love with her. Allegedly Octavian wrote a vulgar squib about the affair, referring to Antony's wife Fulvia:

"Because Antony fucks Glaphyra, Fulvia has arranged
this punishment for me: that I fuck her too.
That I fuck Fulvia? What if Manius begged me
to bugger him? Would I? I don't think so, if I were sane.
'Either fuck or let's fight,' she says. Doesn't she know
my prick is dearer to me than life itself? Let the trumpets blare!"

Original Latin:

Quod futuit Glaphyran Antonius, hanc mihi poenam
Fulvia constituit, se quoque uti futuam.
Fulvia ego ut futuam? Quid si me Manius oret
pedicem, faciam? Non puto, si sapiam.
"Aut futue, aut pugnemus" ait. Quid quod mihi vita
carior est ipsa mentula? Signa canant!

== Sources ==
- "Smith, Dictionary of Greek and Roman Biography and Mythology". Archived from the original on 2010-12-21.
- "Archelaus | king of Cappadocia". Britannica.com.
- "Cleopatra VII". Tyndalehouse.com.
- J. Watkins, A biographical, historical and chronological dictionary: containing accurate accounts of the lives, characters, and actions, of the most eminent persons of all ages and all countries: including the revolutions of states, and the succession of sovereign princes (Google eBook), Printed by R. Phillips by T. Gillet, 1807
- G. Crabb, Universal historical dictionary: or explanation of the names of persons and places in the departments of biblical, political and eccles. history, mythology, heraldry, biography, bibliography, geography, and numismatics, Volume 1, Baldwin and Cradock, 1833
- R. Syme and A.R. Birley, Anatolica: studies in Strabo, Oxford University Press, 1995
- D. Dueck, H. Lindsay and S. Pothecary, Strabo's cultural geography: the making of a kolossourgia, Cambridge University Press, 2005
