= Harriman =

Harriman or Hariman (variant Herriman) is a surname derived from the given name Herman, and in turn occurs as a placename derived from the surname in the United States.

== Buildings ==
- Dr. O.B. Harriman House, a historic home in Hampton, Iowa, U.S.
- Harriman Historic District, a residential area in Bristol, Pennsylvania
- Hariman Sanatorium, Grand Forks, North Dakota
- Harriman School, a one-room schoolhouse in Sebec, Maine, U.S.

== Inhabited places ==
- Harriman, New York, U.S.
- Harriman, Tennessee, U.S.

== Transportation ==
- Harriman station, a metro station in Harriman, New York
- Harriman station (Erie Railroad), a former metro station in Harriman, New York
- Harriman Station, original name of Greystone station in Yonkers, New York City

== Surname ==
- Harriman (surname)

== Parks ==
- Harriman State Park (Idaho), located on the Harriman Wildlife Refuge in Fremont County, Idaho
- Harriman State Park (New York), in Rockland and Orange counties, donated by the Harriman family
- Harriman State Park (disambiguation)

== Other uses ==
- Harriman Glacier, Alaska, U.S.
- Harriman Institute, Columbia University, New York City

== See also ==
- Herriman (disambiguation)
