= Herriman (surname) =

Herriman is a surname. Notable people with the surname include:

- Damon Herriman, Australian actor
- Delme Herriman (born 1973), British basketball player
- Don Herriman (born 1946), Canadian ice hockey player
- George Herriman (1880–1944), American cartoonist
- William H. Herriman (1829–1918), American art collector
- William S. Herriman (1791–1867), American businessman

== See also ==
- Herriman, Utah, a city in southwestern Salt Lake County
- Herriman High School, a public high school in Herriman, Utah
- Harriman (disambiguation)
