= Ralph Pomeroy (gynecologist) =

American gynecologist

Ralph Hayward Pomeroy (January 12, 1867 in New York City – August 22, 1925) was an American gynecologist who became posthumously famous for the female sterilization procedure that he had developed and now carries his name as the Pomeroy tubal ligation.

Pomeroy went to Wesleyan University, Middletown, Connecticut and graduated from the Long Island College Hospital in Brooklyn. He became an associate professor at the same institution in 1912, and was one of the founders of the Williamsburg Hospital, Brooklyn. He was elected President of the Kings County Medical Society in 1916. Pomeroy developed his technique of tubal ligation but never reported or published it. His associates, Bishop and Nelms, presented the procedure and results four years after his death at a medical meeting in 1929 and published it the following year. Its simplicity and effectiveness made the Pomeroy procedure a common choice for female sterilization that is still being used today. Later, Irving operation was proposed to reduce the failure rate of Pomeroy procedure for female sterilization.

The “Pomeroy” procedure is performed on each fallopian tube where a knuckle is created, tied with catgut, and the tube at the apex of the knuckle is severed.
