= William Herriman =

William Herriman may refer to:

- William H. Herriman (1829–1918), American art collector
- William S. Herriman (1791–1867), businessman and president of Long Island Bank
