= Conceptus Inc. =

- Company type: Privately held company
- Industry: Medical devices
- Founded: 1992
- Defunct: June 5, 2013
- Fate: Acquired
- Successor: Bayer AG
- Headquarters: Mountain View, California, United States
- Area served: Worldwide
- Products: Non-incisional micro-catheter for fallopian tubes, Essure female sterilization device
- Parent: Bayer AG
- Website: www.conceptus.com

Conceptus was an American medical products manufacturer and developer. Since 2013, it has been a fully owned subsidiary of Bayer AG of Germany.

== History ==
Founded in 1992, the corporation had its headquarters in Mountain View, California. The company began the development of micro-catheter and guidewire systems that allowed physicians to access and navigate the fallopian tubes using a non-incisional approach. While this technology was first used in products to diagnose or treat infertility, in 1998, the company focused on the design, development, and clinical testing of Essure, a non-incisional alternative to tubal ligation.

Essure showed promise by eliminating the cutting, clipping, and burning associated with tubal ligation. After clinical testing, Conceptus began marketing Essure commercially in Australia, Singapore, Europe, and Canada. In 2002, the US Food and Drug Administration approved the use of Essure in the United States.

On April 29, 2013, Bayer AG made a cash offer of $31.00 per share for Conceptus, a 20% premium to the company's stock market price, valuing it at $1.1bn. The deal was completed and closed on June 5, 2013.
