= AQV =

AQV can refer to:

- Anticoncepción quirúrgica voluntaria, a Spanish phrase that means "voluntary surgical contraception", i.e. surgical sterilization
- AQV, a model of engine formerly made by the Volkswagen Group; see List of discontinued Volkswagen Group petrol engines
