= Oedipus and the Sphinx =

Painting by Gustave Moreau

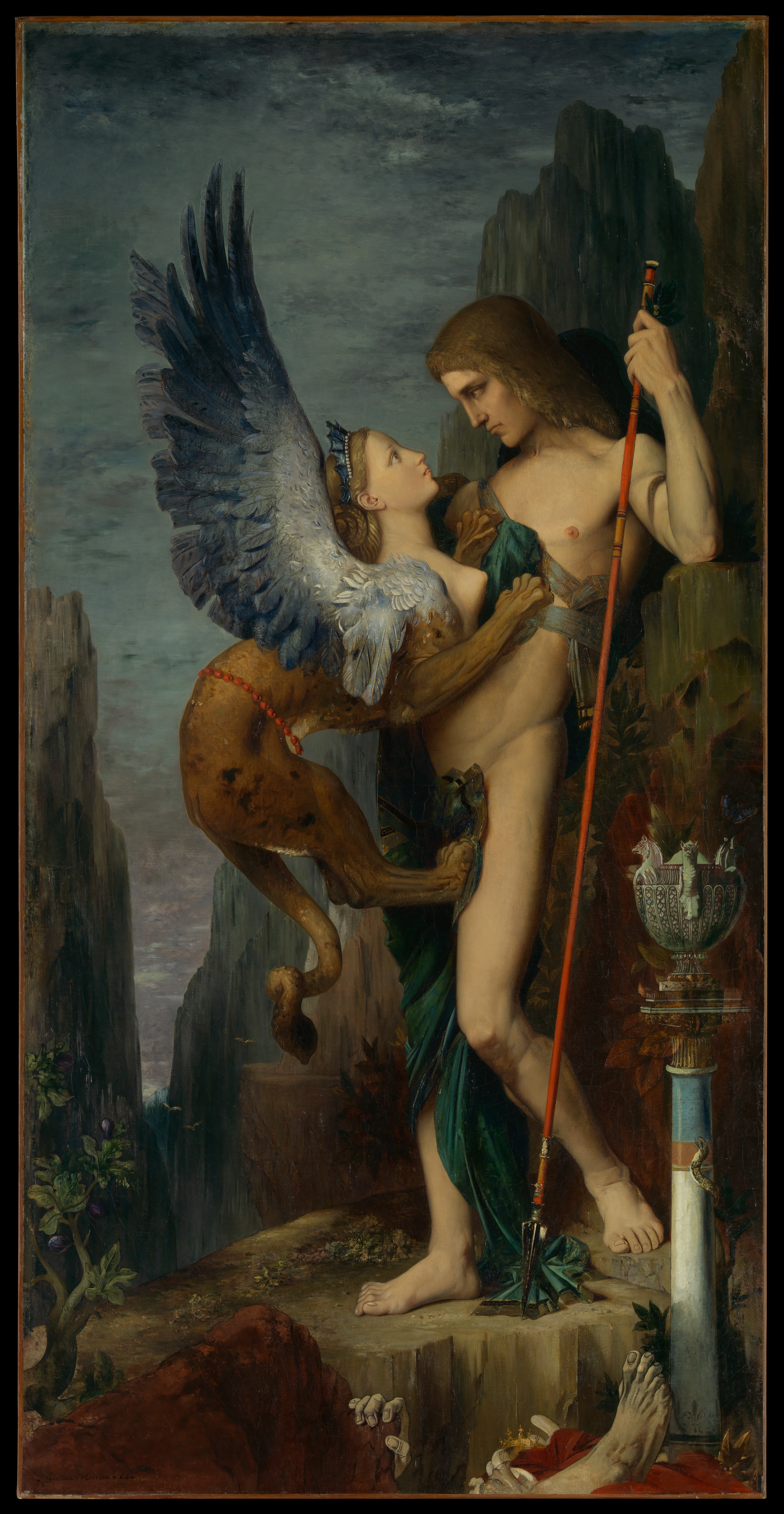
- Artist: Gustave Moreau
- Year: 1864
- Medium: oil on canvas
- Dimensions: 204 cm × 105 cm (80 in × 41 in)
- Location: Metropolitan Museum of Art, New York

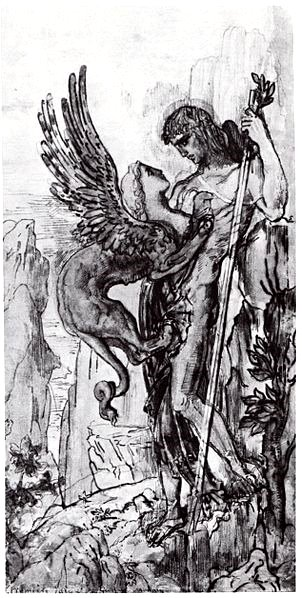
Original watercolour of the idea for Oedipus and the Sphinx, 1861.

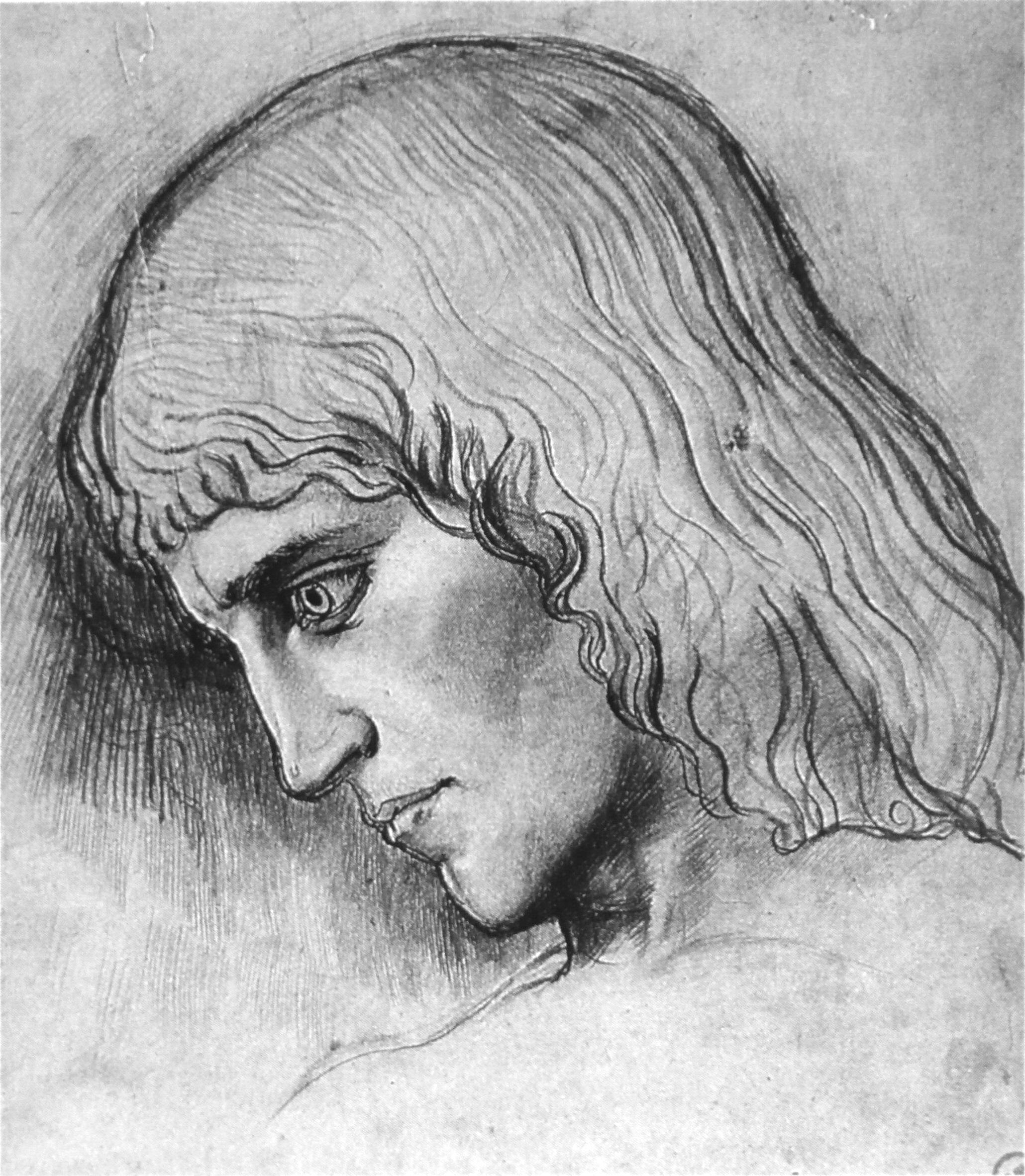
Study for the head of Oedipus

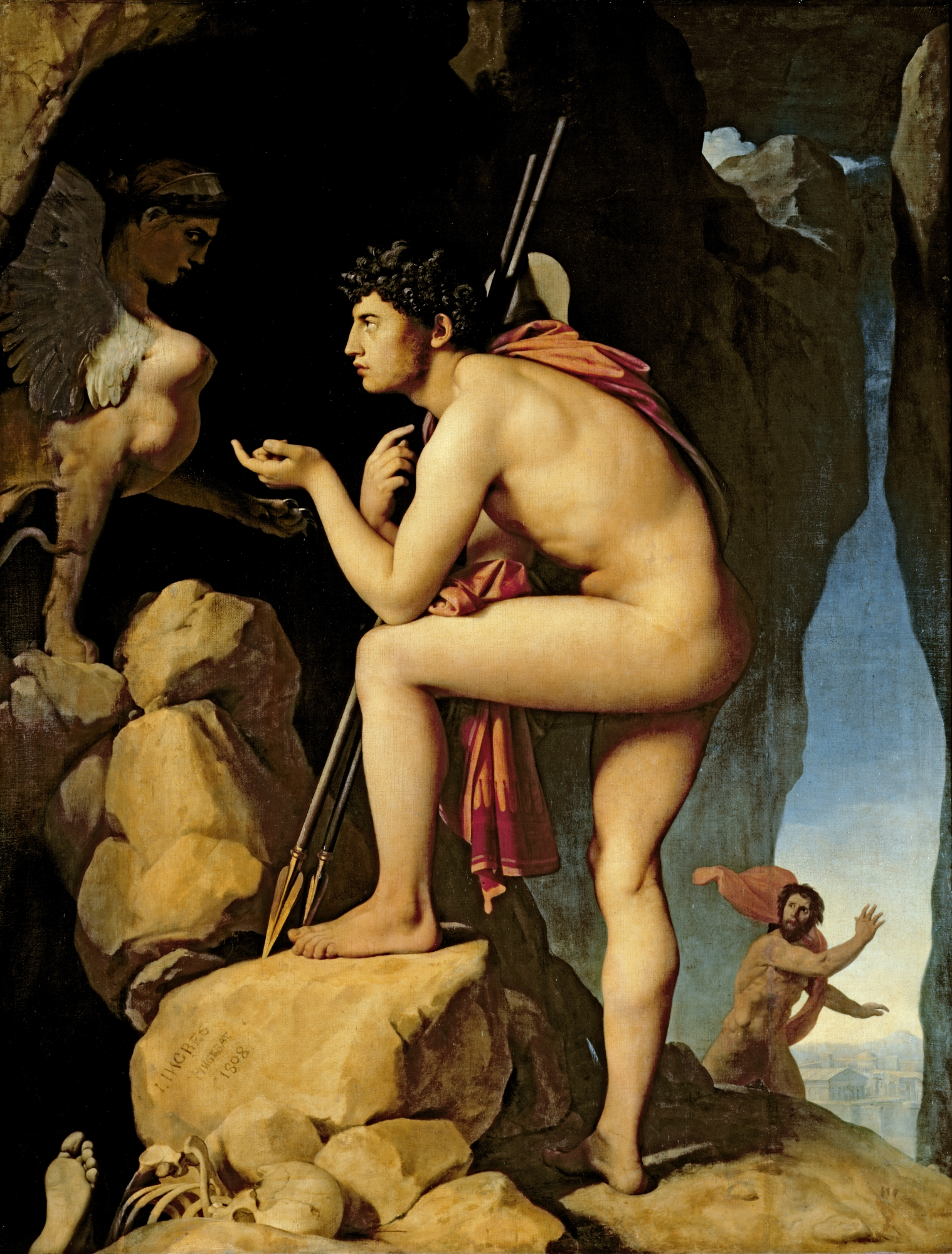
Oedipus and the Sphinx, Ingres, 1808. Oil on Canvas. Louvre, Paris.

Oedipus and the Sphinx is an 1864 oil on canvas painting by Gustave Moreau that was first exhibited at the French Salon of 1864 where it was an immediate success. It is now in the Metropolitan Museum of Art. The work was a fresh treatment of the established subject of the meeting between Oedipus and the Sphinx on the road outside Thebes, as described in Sophocles's play Oedipus Rex.

== Subject matter ==
The painting depicts Oedipus meeting the Sphinx at the crossroads on his journey between Thebes and Delphi. Oedipus must answer the Sphinx's riddle correctly in order to pass. Failure means his own death and that of the besieged Thebans. The riddle was: "What walks on four feet in the morning, two in the afternoon and three at night?". Oedipus answered: "Man: as an infant, he crawls on all fours; as an adult, he walks on two legs and; in old age, he uses a walking stick". Oedipus was the first to answer the riddle correctly and, having heard Oedipus' answer, the Sphinx was astounded and killed herself by throwing herself into the sea. Oedipus thereby won the freedom of the Thebans, the kingdom of that city, and as his wife, Jocasta, who was later revealed to be his mother.

== Style and antecedents ==
In this work Moreau deliberately rejects the realism and naturalism in vogue in mid nineteenth century France, instead adopting a deliberately archaic painting style and mythological subject matter. Moreau had sketched Ingres' 1808 Oedipus and the Sphinx in Paris and that is a likely source for his version of the story. Ingres also painted a later version (c. 1826) which is now in the National Gallery, London, but it is uncertain whether Moreau saw that work. The influence of Italian Renaissance master Andrea Mantegna has also been detected in Moreau's version.

Unlike Ingres' version where Oedipus appears as the dominant figure with the Sphinx on the defensive and partly obscured, in Moreau's version the Sphinx is on the offensive, clawing at Oedipus whose victory in the encounter does not yet seem assured. Indeed, other works by Moreau often feature victorious sphinxes atop a mound of victims.

The Sphinx in the painting may be seen as a form of femme fatale, a common theme in late nineteenth century arts and particularly of Symbolist painting. Ragnar von Holten has argued that the subject depicts not only the battle between good and evil, but also between the sexes, and that the opening poem of Buch der Lieder by Heinrich Heine was the source for the idea of the painting. In that poem the Sphinx triumphs over Oedipus. In a Freudian interpretation, it has been argued that the Sphinx represents the castrating effect of Moreau's mother that he has been seeking to escape. At the time the painting was created, Moreau's father had recently died.

By contrast, Henri Dorra has suggested that the poses of the sphinx and Oedipus are derived from the Greek etymological meaning of the word sphinx, which is to clutch, embrace, or cling to. Dorra notes that a paper on the subject by Michel Bréal had been published in 1863, the year before the work was painted. Dorra also draws attention to the symbolic meaning of some of the elements in the picture, which could have autobiographical aspects, and the possible derivation of the treatment of the subject from the design of a Bithynian coin of Nicomedes II depicting Zeus leaning on a staff with an eagle on his right.

The intense gaze shared between the two has been seen as characteristic of Moreau "who again and again suggests an ambiguous mirror-image, two aspects, two abstract entities that confront each other and recognize each other all too well".

== Reception ==
The painting was an immediate success at the Salon. E. de Sault wrote in the Temps of Moreau's "devotion to the old masters, and the knowledge and application of sound principles and traditions. The painter of Oedipus, obscure and unknown yesterday, and who will be famous tomorrow". It rescued what was otherwise seen as a mediocre show, with one critic commenting, "Mr. Gustave Moreau is the hero of this Exhibition and the grumblers proclaim that if the Salon of 1864 is retrieved from discredit, it is thanks to Oedipus and the Sphinx".

Critics of the 1860s identified Moreau as an artist who reshaped the very scope of history painting. Between 1860 and 1869, his Salon submissions demonstrated a departure from the dominant theatrical mode: rather than presenting dramatic interaction among figures, he pursued what has been described as "contemplative immobility." His mythological protagonists, frozen and allegorised, resisted conventional narrative clarity. By reviving allegory—already considered obsolete—he produced works that critics found enigmatic, opening history painting to the ambiguity and layered resonance of the symbol.

The work has been interpreted as Moreau's most forceful response to the mid-nineteenth-century debate between idealism and materialism in French art. Critics at the Salon hailed the painting as uniting "thought and execution," surpassing Ingres by revealing "the symbol hidden behind the fable." For Moreau, the sphinx embodied matter, sensuality, and destruction—the femme fatale whose allure threatened masculine reason—while Oedipus represented moral strength and ascetic self-mastery. Moreau transformed the scene into one of emotional proximity and physical intimacy, reimagining the traditionally fearsome creature as a figure expressing desperation and need, shown in close contact with an unusually composed Oedipus. Rather than depicting the hero as threatened or challenged, Moreau presents him as remarkably nonchalant, maintaining an almost leisurely pose even with evidence of the sphinx's deadly nature surrounding them. The humanization of the sphinx is particularly striking—she displays refined, almost noble features and decorative elements that highlight her feminine aspects over her mythological monstrosity.

This deliberate distance from the realism of his contemporaries positioned Moreau as an artist who preferred to inhabit a world of legend, myth, and symbol, seeking in them a "priestly solemnity." His figures were sometimes judged as stiff or stylised, yet admirers praised the splendour of his colour, the gemlike intensity of his surfaces, and the enchanted outlook that animated his mythological subjects. Poets and critics such as Renan and Huysmans admired his imagination, recognising in him a visionary who rejected material reality in favour of inner truth. Oedipus and the Sphinx can thus be read as part of the broader nineteenth-century yearning for "dream countries of romance and legend" that inspired the Gothic revival, the Pre-Raphaelites, and other movements.

The primary criticism levelled at the work concerned its artistic influences. Critic Paul de Saint-Victor warned that Moreau should extricate himself from the "harsh embrace" of Mantegna in order to realise his full potential, while Jules Claretie commented that it was drawn like a Mantegna but as poetic as a Leonardo da Vinci. Maxime du Camp, however, felt that it more resembled Vittore Carpaccio's St. George and the Dragon (1502), which Moreau had copied in Venice and which also contains the gory remains of conflict. Another critic observed that a Greek sphinx, half-woman and half-vulture, was shown, rather than an Egyptian seated sphinx, but felt that whereas Ingres had presented a modern Oedipus, Moreau had better interpreted the classical Oedipus.

After the Salon, Moreau quickly gained a reputation for eccentricity. One commentator said Moreau's work was "like a pastiche of Mantegna created by a German student who relaxes from his painting by reading Schopenhauer".

== History ==
The painting was first sold by the artist in 1864 to Prince Napoléon Bonaparte, who had a reputation as a discerning connoisseur, and paid a full 8000 francs for the work. It was then sold in 1868 to Paul Durand-Ruel, and then in the same year to William H. Herriman of Rome who gave it to the Metropolitan Museum of Art in 1920 where it is one of the few important Moreau paintings outside France.

On his death, Moreau left all of his extant paintings to the French nation where they formed the basis for the subsequent Gustave Moreau Museum.
