= Irving operation =

Gynecological sterilization operation

- Specialty: Gynaecology

The Irving operation is a gynaecological operative technique for permanent sterilization in women. It was proposed to reduce the failure rate of the Pomeroy procedure for female sterilization. In the Irving operation, the proximal part of fallopian tube is buried back into the myometrium, thereby obstructing its lumen.

== History ==
The Irving operation was proposed by Dr. Irving in 1924.

== Operation technique ==
A transverse incision is made on the abdomen and the fallopian tube is identified. While holding the fallopian tube with an Allis clamp, a hemostat is used to open the mesosalpinx. Using absorbable sutures, the proximal portion of the fallopian tube is tied, and a segment of the fallopian tube is removed. The proximal part of the fallopian tube is pulled into the defect. The distal portions of the Fallopian tube are ligated and left in place. The abdomen is closed in layers.

== Reversal ==
The Irving operation can be reversed with tubal reversal microsurgery. The pregnancy rate after tubal reversal in Irving operation is around 60 percent.
