= William H. Herriman =

American art collector (1829–1918)

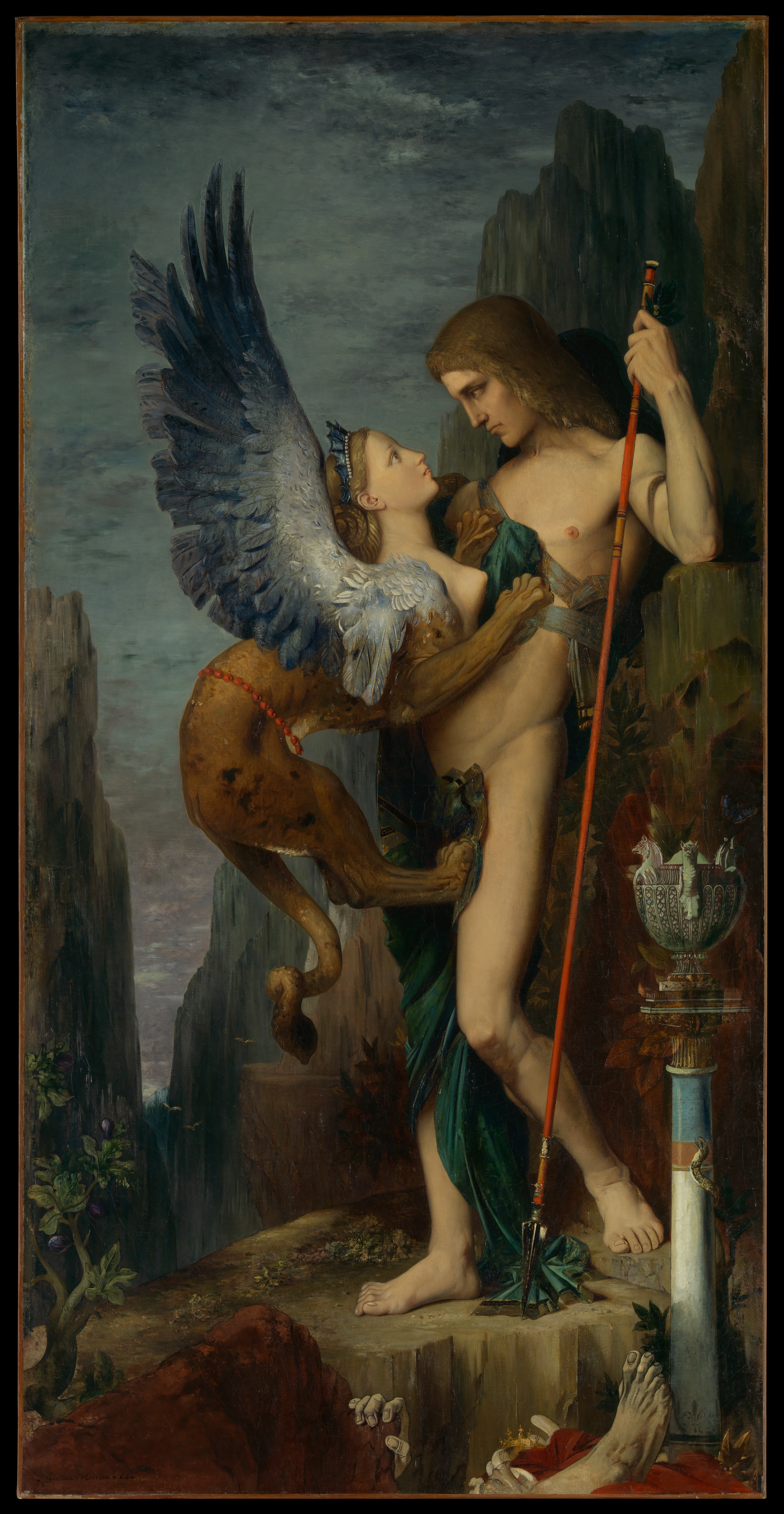
Oedipus and the Sphinx, Gustave Moreau, 1864. Oil on canvas. Donated by Herriman to the Metropolitan Museum of Art, New York.

William Henry Herriman (February 7, 1829 – July 26, 1918) was an American art collector. Active in Rome, he collected a significant amount of art which were to the Metropolitan Museum of Art in New York and the Brooklyn Museum.

== Herriman family ==
William Henry Herriman was the second son (and third child) of the wealthy Brooklyn businessman and President of Long Island Bank, William S. Herriman and his wife Maria Belle Stillwell Frecke/Freeke. William H. married Elizabeth Herriman née Wyckoff (April 23, 1834 – May 5, 1910).

His sister was Caroline Herriman Polhemus (died 1906), the wife of Henry Ditmas Polhemus. After his death, she founded the Polhemus Memorial Clinic, the first "skyscraper hospital", in honour of her late husband, who had served as the Regent of Long Island College Hospital (LICH) from 1872 until his death in 1895. She also founded the Herriman Home in Monsey, Rockland County.

== Life in Rome ==
Herriman and his wife first lived in Brooklyn, New York, but moved to Rome in 1865. Their friend, Maitland Armstrong, said of them: "They exercised a quiet and generous hospitality in their delightful apartment, and were among the best friends the American artists had, for they bought their pictures, befriended them in their need, nursed them in sickness, and lent them money when they were hard up. Mr. Herriman was a wise collector, not only of pictures but of all sorts of rare objects of art."

== Donations ==
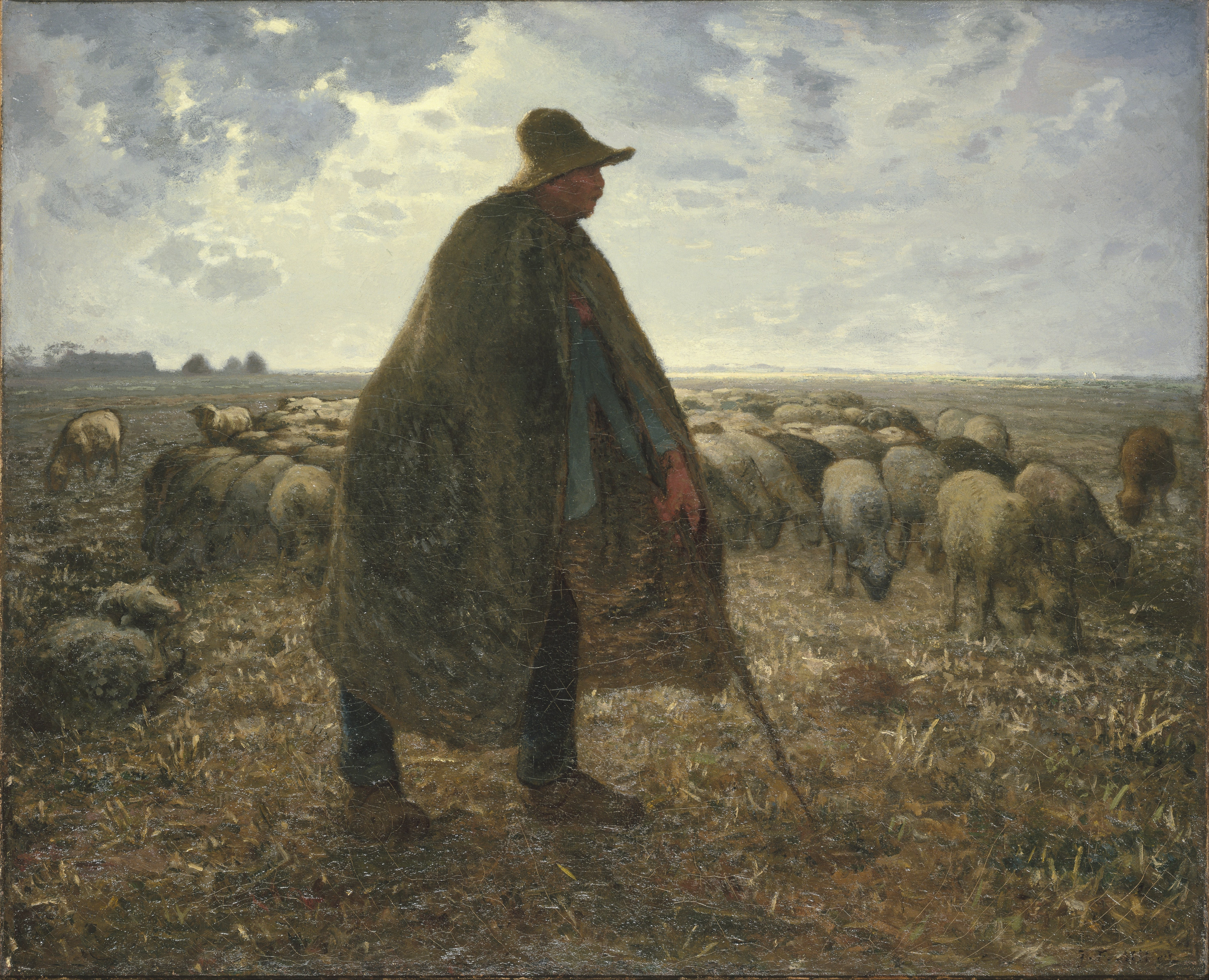
Shepherd Tending His Flock. Jean-François Millet, 1860–63. Oil on canvas.

Herriman left a large number of works to the Brooklyn Museum on his death, including Jean-François Millet's 1860s painting, Shepherd Tending His Flock. He left fewer works to the Metropolitan Museum of Art, but among those he did donate to them was one of the most important that he owned, Gustave Moreau's 1864 Oedipus and the Sphinx, one of the few Moreau paintings in private hands. On his death Moreau had left all of his extant paintings to the French nation where they formed the basis for the subsequent Gustave Moreau Museum. Accordingly, important Moreau paintings are scarce outside France. Herriman had purchased Oedipus and the Sphinx in 1868 during Moreau's lifetime and it was installed at 93, Piazza di Spagna, Rome, by January 1869.

Herriman was also a benefactor to the American Academy in Rome Library and with J. P. Morgan, paid for the completion of Saint Paul's church murals in that city, unveiled in 1913.

== Death ==
Herriman died in Rome on July 26, 1918. Elizabeth also died in Rome. Both are buried at the Non-Catholic Cemetery in Rome, as are the poets John Keats and Percy Bysshe Shelley. The Herrimans had no children. Herriman left two wills, one covering his Italian assets to the value of $231,000 and another covering his United States assets, value $2,500,000. His paintings were divided between The Brooklyn Museum of Arts and Science, the American Academy in Rome and various American and Italian institutions.

== Donations to the Brooklyn Museum ==
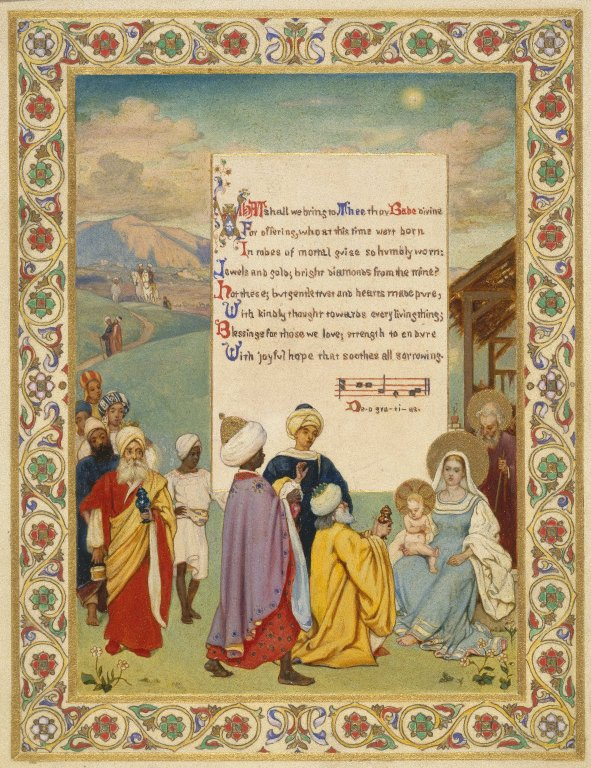
The Adoration of the Magi. Charles Caryl Coleman, 1880–81. Oil and gold paint.

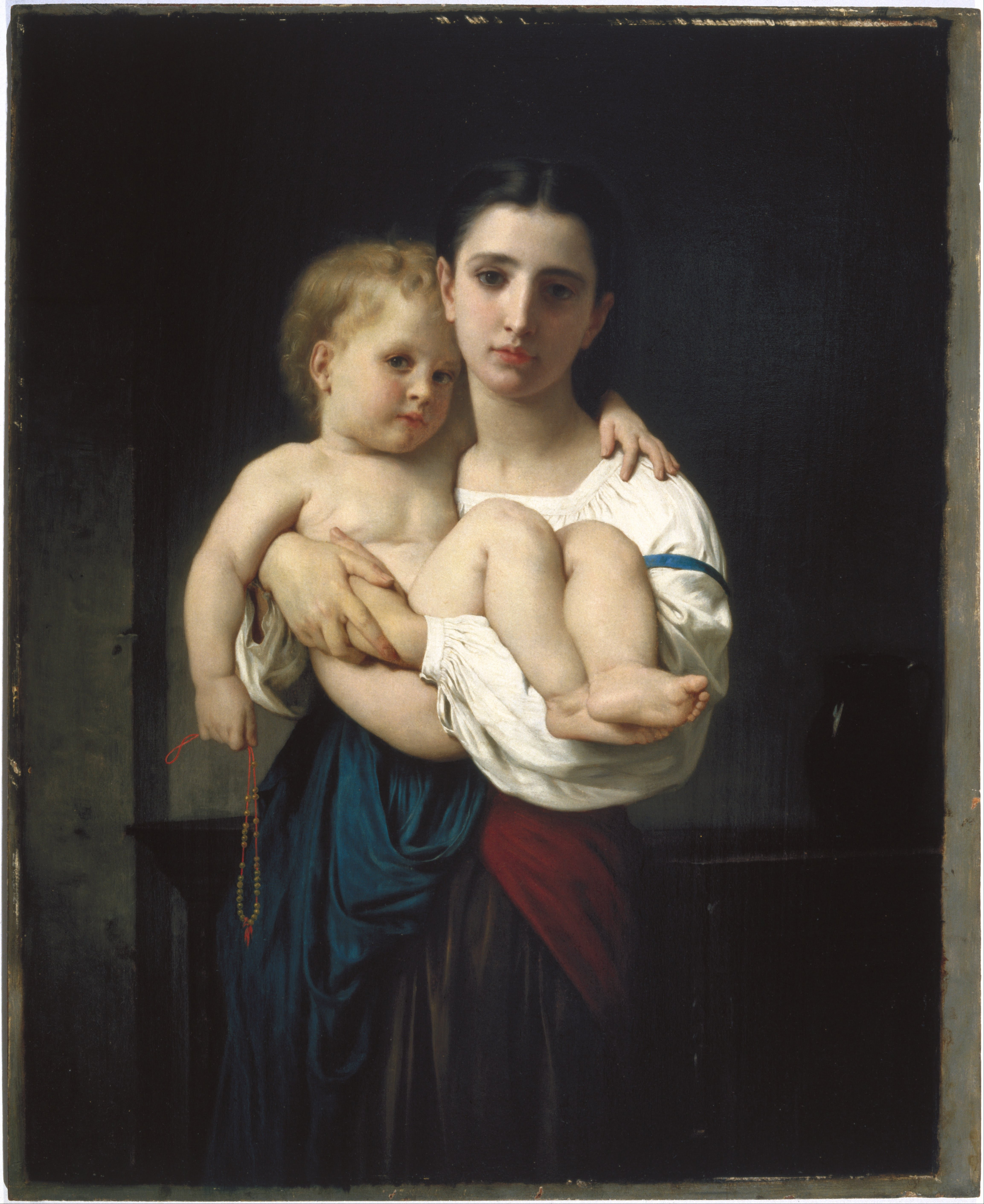
The Elder Sister. William Bouguereau, c. 1864. Oil on panel.

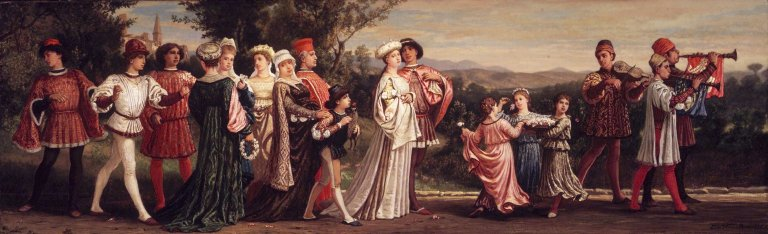
Wedding Procession. Elihu Vedder, 1872–75. Oil on canvas.

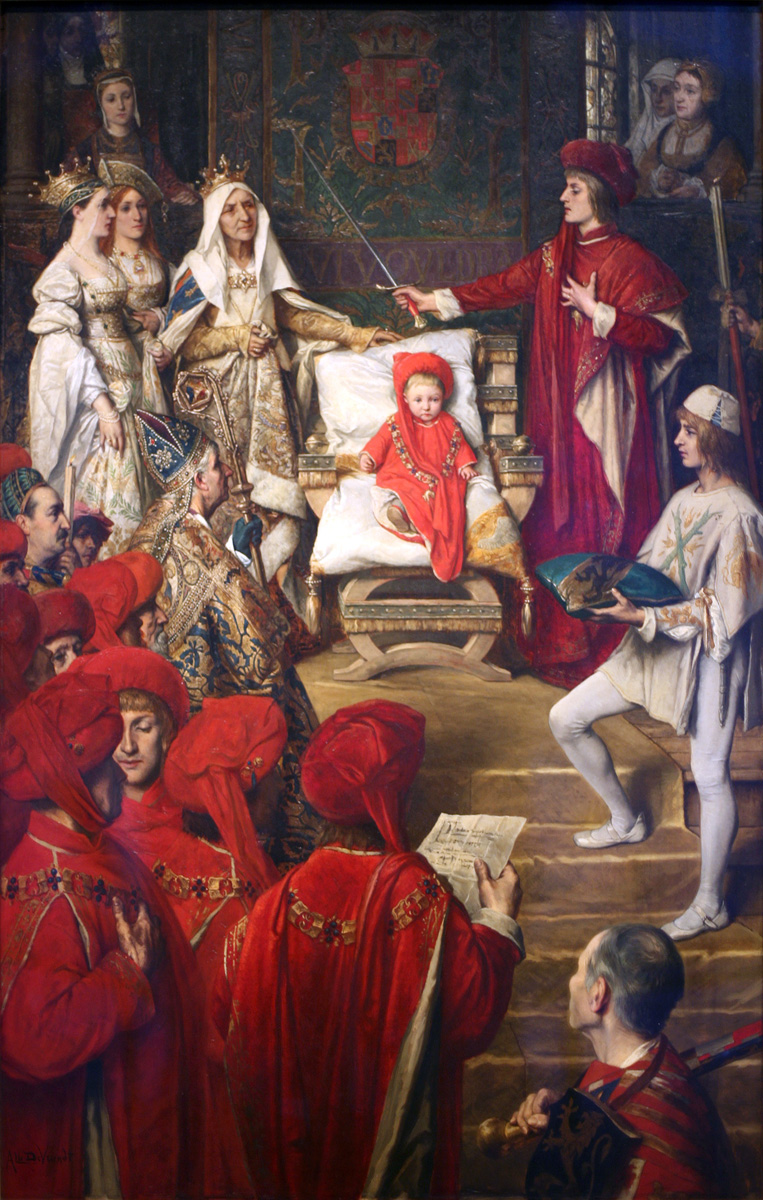
Philip I, the Handsome, Conferring the Order of the Golden Fleece on his Son Charles of Luxembourg. Albrecht De Vriendt, 1880. Oil on panel.
