= Tubal reversal =

Surgical reconnection of tubal ligation

- ICD-9-CM: 66.7

Tubal reversal, also called tubal sterilization reversal, tubal ligation reversal, or microsurgical tubal reanastomosis, is a surgical procedure that can restore fertility to women after a tubal ligation. By rejoining the separated segments of the fallopian tube, tubal reversal can give women the chance to become pregnant again. In some cases, however, the separated segments cannot actually be reattached to each other. In some cases the remaining segment of tube needs to be re-implanted into the uterus (a 'tubal reimplantation'). In other cases, when the end of the tube (the 'fimbria') has been removed, a procedure called a neofimbrioplasty must be performed to recreate a functional end of the tube which can then act like the missing fimbria and retrieve the egg that has been released during ovulation.

== Tubal anatomy ==
The fallopian tube is a muscular tube extending from the uterus and ending with attached fimbria next to the ovary. The tube is attached to the ovary by a thin tissue called the mesosalpinx. The inner tubal lining is lined with cilia. These are microscopic hair-like projections that beat in waves that push fluid down the tube towards the uterus thereby helping move the egg or ovum to the uterus in conjunction with muscular contractions of the tube. The fallopian tube is normally about 10 cm (4 inches) long and consists of several regions that become wider as the tube gets farther away from the uterus. Starting from the uterus and proceeding outward, these are the:

- Interstitial region – extends from the uterine cavity through the uterine muscle
- Isthmic region – narrow muscular portion adjacent to the uterus
- Ampullary region – wider and longer middle part of the tube
- Infundibular region – funnel shaped segment next to the fimbrial end
- Fimbrial region – wide opening at the end of the tube that is responsible for 'catching' the egg after it is released from the ovary during ovulation

== Tubal reversal surgeries ==
Tubal reversal surgeries require the techniques of microsurgery to open and reconnect the fallopian tube segments that remain after a tubal sterilization, reimplant remaining segments, or create new fimbria.

=== Tubotubal anastomosis ===
Following a tubal ligation, there are usually two remaining fallopian tube segments – the proximal (close) tubal segment that emerges from the uterus and the distal (far) tubal segment that ends with the fimbria next to the ovary. After opening the blocked ends of the remaining tubal segments, a variety of microsurgical techniques are utilized to recreate a functional tube. The newly created tubal openings are drawn next to each other by placing sutures in the connective tissue that lies beneath the fallopian tubes (mesosalpinx). The retention suture prevents the tubal segments from pulling apart while the tube heals. Microsurgical sutures are used to precisely align the tubal lumens (inside canal of tube), the muscular portion (muscularis externa), and the outer layer (serosa) of the tube. Most surgeons try to avoid the use of stents which can damage the delicate cilia that line the tube and create the flow of fluid that is needed to push the egg and embryo into the uterus. Other surgeons use a narrow flexible stent to gently thread through the tubal segments or into the uterine cavity in order to line up the tubes in order to reconnect them. In either case, once the microsurgical repair is completed dye is injected through the cervix into the uterus and out through the tubes to ensure that the fallopian tube is open from the uterine cavity to its fimbrial end. The surgeons who use stents then gently withdraw them from the fimbrial end of the tube after the repair is completed.

=== Tubal Reimplantation ===
In a small percentage of cases, a tubal ligation procedure leaves only the distal (far) portion of the fallopian tube and no proximal (close) tubal segment. This can occur when any method of tubal ligation has been applied to the isthmic segment of the fallopian tube as it emerges from the uterus. In this situation, a new opening can be created through the uterine muscle and the remaining tubal segment inserted into the uterine cavity. This microsurgical procedure is called tubal reimplantation.

=== Neofimbrioplasty ===
Fimbriectomy is a very uncommon type of tubal ligation that is performed by removing the end (fimbria) of the fallopian tube leaving only the tubal segment attached to the uterus. After fimbriectomy, if the remaining tubal segment is long enough, the end of the tube can be opened and 'new' fimbria can be created by a procedure called a neofimbrioplasty. These "new" fimbria are not actually fimbria, but they are the cilia from the inside of the fallopian tube that have been exposed by everting the tubal lumen much like the petals of a rose are exposed once the rose blooms. These 'new' fimbria are much less effective at collecting (catching) an egg that has been released from the ovary than the real fimbria that had been removed during the fimbriectomy performed by the surgeon who did the original tubal ligation. During a neofimbrioplasty the tubal end is opened and folded back (marsupialized) so that the tubal end remains open and exposing the internal lining of the tube.

=== Mini-laparotomy tubal reversal ===
Mini-laparotomy for tubal reversal surgery involves making a small, 2 to 3 inch incision in the abdominal wall just above the pubic bone after shaving the hair with a sterile hair clipper. The size and location of the incision as well as the plastic surgery techniques used to close it make the thin scar nearly invisible after it has healed. Atraumatic surgical techniques involve the use of local anesthesia at the incision site and other tissues operated upon. This makes the surgery comfortable and minimizes post-operative pain. As opposed to standard operative methods, avoiding the use of surgical retractors and packs, constantly irrigating tissues to keep them moist and at body temperature, and operating under magnification throughout the procedure results in very rapid patient recovery. Operating with microsurgical instruments allows precision in suturing of the tubal segments.

=== Microsurgical Tubal Reanastomosis (MTR) ===
In this Process, The area of the tubes which was occluded is removed, leaving only open, healthy tube. These open, healthy, tubal segments are then connected. A multi layer, micro surgical technique is used to suture these segments together. After the tubes are repaired, a chromopertubation is performed wherein dye is injected into the uterus. This dye is passed through the repaired tubes to ensure that the tubes are open. The entire surgery is performed through a small incision of about 3 to 4 inches just at the uppermost part of the hair line. Failing to properly align the tubal segments, or damaging these delicate structures, can make the difference between a successful and an unsuccessful operation.

=== Laparoscopic tubal reversal ===
Laparoscopic Tubal Reversal is a minimally-invasive surgical procedure (laparoscopy), using small, specially designed instruments to repair and reconnect the fallopian tubes.

After general anesthesia has been administered, a 5mm (less than 3/8-inch) tube (trocar) is inserted inside the navel, and a special gas is pumped into the abdomen to create enough space to perform the operation safely and precisely. The laparoscope (a telescope), attached to a camera, is brought into the abdomen through the same tube, and the pelvis and abdomen are thoroughly inspected. The fallopian tubes are evaluated and the obstruction (ligation, burn, ring, or clip) is examined. Three small instruments (5mm each, less than 1/4-inch) are used to remove the occlusion and prepare the two segments of the tube to be reconnected.

Once the connection (anastomosis) is completed, a blue dye is injected through the cervix, traveling through the uterus and tubes, all the way to the abdomen. This is to make sure the tubes have been aligned properly and that the connection is working well.

Patients are sent home the same day of surgery. The few stitches that are placed will be under the skin and will be absorbed by the body, without need for removal.

Patients should wait two months prior to attempting pregnancy in order to give the tubes a chance to heal completely. Trying to conceive before could result in an increased risk of ectopic pregnancy (pregnancy inside the fallopian tube instead of in the uterus).

When performed by a trained laparoscopic tubal reversal surgeon, laparoscopic tubal reversal combines the success rates of micro-surgical techniques with the advantages of minimally-invasive surgery – namely faster recovery, better healing, less pain, fewer complications, and no large disfiguring scars. Laparoscopic surgery can be more expensive than an open surgery using a 2 to 3 inch incision because it requires additional surgical equipment.

=== Robotic assisted tubal reversal ===
Robotic assisted tubal reversal surgery is a surgical procedure in which the fallopian tubes are repaired by a surgeon using a remotely controlled, robotic surgical system.

The robotic system involves two components: a patient side-cart (also referred to as the robot) and a surgeon's console. The robot is placed adjacent to the patient and has several attached arms. Each arm has a unique surgical instrument and performs a specialized surgical function. The surgeon sits near the patient at the surgeon's console and visualizes the surgery through a monitor. The surgeon performs the entire reversal surgery using controllers located inside the surgeon's console.

Robotic tubal ligation reversal uses the same small incisions as a traditional laparotomy tubal reversal surgery. Smaller incisions generally result in less pain and quicker return to work when compared to traditional tubal ligation reversal using larger abdominal incisions. The robotic system offers a greater range of motion and more surgical dexterity than a surgeon can obtain during laparoscopic tubal ligation reversal, but not as much dexterity as with an open procedure using a 2 to 3 inch incision. The disadvantages to robotic surgery are longer operating times and much higher costs than even traditional laparoscopic surgery.

A retrospective, Cleveland Clinic study compared 26 patients who underwent robotic assisted tubal reversal to 41 patients who underwent outpatient mini-laparotomy (abdominal incision) tubal reversal. Robotic tubal reversal patients, when compared to abdominal tubal reversal surgery patients, had longer times under anesthesia (283 minutes vs 205 minutes) and longer times in surgery (229 minutes vs 181 minutes). On average, robotic tubal reversal patients returned to work one week sooner than abdominal tubal reversal patients and the robotic tubal reversal surgeries were also more expensive than abdominal tubal reversal surgeries.

An Ohio State University study evaluating robotic tubal reversal vs abdominal tubal reversal discovered similar findings but also evaluated pregnancy outcomes. Robotic tubal reversal surgery, when compared to abdominal tubal reversal surgery, had longer operative times (201 minutes vs 155 minutes), shorter hospital stays (4 hours compared to 34 hours), and quicker return to activities of daily living. Pregnancy outcomes of robotic tubal reversal surgery patients were also compared to pregnancy outcome of abdominal incision tubal reversal patients. Approximately 65% of the robotic tubal reversal surgery patients became pregnant compared with 50% of the abdominal incision patients. Of the pregnancies, 6 abnormal pregnancies were in the robotic tubal reversal patients (4 ectopic and 2 miscarriage) and 2 were in the abdominal incision patients (1 ectopic and 1 miscarriage). Both surgeries were expensive and were found to cost in excess of $92,000. Robotic tubal reversal surgery was slightly more costly than the abdominal incision tubal reversal.

=== Essure sterilization reversal ===
Essure sterilization was a tubal occlusion procedure that was approved by the FDA in 2002. The Essure procedure involves inserting a small camera (hysteroscope) through the cervix and into the uterine cavity. Two small, metallic coils are then inserted into each tubal ostia and into the isthmic portion of the fallopian tube. The coils cause the isthmic portion of the fallopian tube to be blocked with scar tissue. To confirm tubal closure, a hysterosalpingogram should be performed three months after the Essure procedure. If either fallopian tube is open after the Essure procedure, then the Essure procedure can be repeated or another type of tubal occlusion method can be performed. Essure was discontinued in 2018 due to a large number of reported serious adverse events.

Reversal of Essure sterilization requires the blocked isthmic portion of the tube be bypassed by tubouterine implantation. During a tubouterine implantation procedure, the blocked portion of the fallopian tube containing the Essure sterilization device is surgically resected. The remaining portion of each healthy fallopian tube is then reintroduced into the newly created openings. This procedure can restore the natural function of the fallopian tube and allow for natural conception. The first case of successful outpatient tubouterine implantation to reverse Essure sterilization was published in 2012.

Surgeons who published the first case report of successful Essure reversal subsequently published a larger cohort study of 70 patients who underwent outpatient tubouterine implantation to reverse Essure sterilization and 36% of patients reported pregnancy through natural conception.

Dr. Charles Monteith, Medical Director of A Personal Choice Tubal Reversal Center, has collected non-published data on the risks of outpatient Essure reversal surgery. Between 2009 and 2018, Monteith performed 469 outpatient tubouterine implantation procedures to reverse Essure sterilization. He documented intraoperative, postoperative, and pregnancy risks associated with his procedures.

Intraoperative risks observed were failure to complete the planned procedure (either Essure removal and tubal occlusion or Essure removal and bilateral tubouterine implantation) <1%, fracture of Essure devices during removal (approximately 10% risk with manual traction and < 1% with en bloc dissection), transfer to hospital <1%, referral to Emergency room or hospital within 24 hours of surgery <1%, bleeding requiring blood transfusion or hospitalization for operative complication 0%, anesthesia complication 0%, and death 0%.

Postoperative risks observed were major surgical site infection 0%, minor surgical site infection <1%, need for a second operation/procedure within 30 days <1%, and persistent symptoms requiring additional surgery < 10%.

Pregnancy related risks were failure to become pregnant and possible tubal closure (estimated to be <60%) and ectopic pregnancy 5%. All patients were advised to have a planned cesarean delivery before the onset of labor and the risk of uterine rupture was observed to be 4%. The majority of uterine ruptures occurred at 36/37 weeks gestation.

Factors associated with more difficult surgical procedures were patient obesity (BMI ≥ 30), presence of uterine leiomyomas, and uterine adhesive disease primarily from prior cesarean delivery.

=== Adiana sterilization reversal ===
Adiana sterilization was approved by the FDA in 2009. Adiana sterilization is a hysteroscopic tubal occlusion procedure, which is very similar to Essure sterilization. The Adiana procedure involves inserting a small camera (hysteroscope) through the cervix and into the uterine cavity. A smaller catheter is inserted into the tubal ostia. The catheter emits radiowaves (microwaves). The radiowaves cause injury to the tubal lining and will result in the tube gradually closing. Prior to removal of the catheter a small silicone stent is left inside the isthmic portion of the tube and this promotes tubal closure by the acceleration of the tubal scarring.

Adiana sterilization is similar to Essure sterilization and the Adiana procedure causes blockage of the proximal isthmic portion. Adiana sterilization can surgical reversed with tubouterine implantation. The first case of successful outpatient tubouterine implantation to reverse Adiana sterilization was published in 2011.

Hologic Corporation discontinued the procedure in March 2012, resolving ongoing litigation with Conceptus concerning patent infringement claims.

== Tubal reversal success rates ==
Tubal reversal success rates vary widely depending upon many factors. These include the women's ages, methods of tubal ligation that they had performed, experience of the surgeon and techniques for repairing the tubes, length of follow-up after reversal surgery among other factors. Overall, for those who are less than 35 years of age at the time of reversal, more than 70% achieve intrauterine pregnancy, with most pregnancies occurring within 18 months after surgery. Overall, for those who are 35 years of age or more, approximately 55% will achieve an intrauterine pregnancy.
