= William S. Herriman =

American businessman (1791–1867)

William S. Herriman (October 24, 1791 – April 6, 1867) was an American businessman, He became President of Long Island Bank, the first bank in Brooklyn, where he remained until his death when he was replaced by William C. Fowler.

== Family background ==
Herriman was born in 1791 in Jamaica, Queens, New York City as the third of four known surviving children. He had a brother and three sisters. His father was Stephen Herriman (formerly Harriman) III (1757–1792). His mother was Elizabeth Smith (1760–1847). William married Maria Belle Stillwell Frecke/Freeke on December 13, 1820.

== Children ==
Herriman had five children. His second child, Caroline Herriman Polhemus (died 1906), the wife of Henry Ditmas Polhemus, founded the Polhemus Memorial Clinic, the first "skyscraper hospital", in honour of her late husband, who had served as the Regent of Long Island College Hospital (LICH) from 1872 until his death in 1895, and donated $400,000 to LICH for this work. She also founded the Herriman Home in Monsey, Rockland County.

His third child, William H. Herriman (1829–1918), became a noted art collector and gave a large number of paintings to the Brooklyn Museum on his death.

== Death ==
William S. Herriman is buried in the Green-Wood Cemetery, Brooklyn, along with fifteen other people named Herriman between 1848 and 1939.
