= Leffert Lefferts =

Leffert Lefferts (April 12, 1774 – March 22, 1847) was the first President of the Long Island Bank, the first bank in Brooklyn, New York.

== Early life ==
Lefferts was born at the Bedford homestead on April 12, 1774. He was the son of Leffert Lefferts (1727–1804) and Dorothy (née Couwenhoven) Lefferts (1738–1816). The Lefferts family were an important family in the history of Brooklyn and were among the financiers of the State of New York.

He attended Columbia College in 1794.

== Career ==
Lefferts, a Federalist, twice ran, unsuccessfully, for U.S. Congress, losing to his own cousin, John Lefferts, a Democratic-Republican, in 1813. He was also the first judge of Kings County. In 1824, Lefferts, along with Jehiel Jagger, Fanning C. Tucker, Jacob Hicks, Thomas Everitt Jr., founded the Long Island Bank, the first bank in Brooklyn, of which Lefferts served as president.

Judge Lefferts also owned substantial land holdings, which were managed by his son-in-law, James Carson Brevoort, who served as private secretary to Washington Irving when Irving was appointed as United States Minister to Spain in 1842. While members of his family owned slaves, including John Lefferts, Leffert himself did not, and instead, the 1830 census shows "three free people of color" living with members of his family.

== Personal life ==
Lefferts was married to Maria Benson (1793–1875). Maria was the daughter of Dinah (née Couwenhoven) Benson and Lieutenant Colonel Robert Benson (1739–1823), Clerk of the New York State Senate. She was also the sister of New York City Alderman Egbert Benson and niece of U.S. Representative, Egbert Benson. Together, Maria and Leffert were the parents of:

- Elizabeth Dorothea Lefferts (1824–1896), who married James Carson Brevoort (1818–1887), a collector of rare books and coins, in 1845.
- Leffert Lefferts (1826–1827), who died young.

Lefferts died on March 22, 1847. He is buried at Green-Wood Cemetery in Brooklyn.

=== Descendants ===
Through his daughter Elizabeth, he was the grandfather of Henry Lefferts Brevoort (1849–1895), who married Elizabeth Schermerhorn (1852–1928), a daughter of Alfred Schermerhorn and Elizabeth (née Barnewall) Schermerhorn (sister of Louisa Barnewall Van Rensselaer).
