= Tubal ligation =

Surgical clipping, removal or blocking of the fallopian tubes

Tubal ligation / BTL surgery

Background
- Type: Sterilization
- First use: 1930

Failure rates (first year)
- Perfect use: 0.5%
- Typical use: 0.5%

Usage
- Duration effect: Permanent
- Reversibility: Sometimes
- User reminders: None
- Clinic review: None

Advantages and disadvantages
- STI protection: No
- Risks: Operative and postoperative complications

Tubal ligation (commonly known as having one's "tubes tied") is a surgical procedure for female sterilization in which the fallopian tubes are permanently blocked, clipped, or removed. This prevents the fertilization of eggs by sperm and thus the implantation of a fertilized egg. The male equivalent of this operation is vasectomy. Tubal ligation is considered a permanent method of sterilization and birth control by the FDA in the US. Bilateral tubal ligation is not considered a sterilization method by the MHRA in the UK. Tubal ligations require the consent of the female only, and as with other forms of sterilisation or birth control, only the consent of the patient (not partners, their spouse, or families) is required.

== Medical uses ==
Female sterilization through tubal ligation is primarily used to permanently prevent a patient from having a spontaneous pregnancy (as opposed to pregnancy via in vitro fertilization) in the future. While both hysterectomy (the removal of the uterus) and bilateral oophorectomy (the removal of both ovaries) can also accomplish this goal, these surgeries carry generally greater health risks than tubal ligation procedures.

Less commonly, tubal ligation procedures may also be performed for patients who are known to be carriers of mutations in genes that increase the risk of ovarian and fallopian tube cancer, such as BRCA1 and BRCA2. While the procedure for these patients still results in sterilization, the procedure is chosen preferentially among these patients who have completed childbearing, with or without a simultaneous oophorectomy.

=== Benefits and advantages for use as contraception ===
==== High effectiveness ====
Most methods of female sterilization are approximately 99% effective or greater in preventing pregnancy. These rates are roughly equivalent to the effectiveness of long-acting reversible contraceptives such as intrauterine devices and contraceptive implants, and slightly less effective than permanent male sterilization through vasectomy. These rates are significantly higher than other forms of modern contraception that require regular active engagement by the user, such as oral contraceptive pills or male condoms.

==== Avoidance of hormonal medications ====
Many forms of female-controlled contraception rely on the suppression of the menstrual cycle using progesterones and/or estrogens. For patients who wish to avoid hormonal medications because of personal medical contraindications such as breast cancer, unacceptable side effects, or personal preference, tubal ligation offers highly effective birth control without the use of hormones.

==== Reduction of pelvic inflammatory disease risk ====
Occluding or removing both fallopian tubes decreases the likelihood that a sexually transmitted infection can ascend from the vagina to the abdominal cavity, causing pelvic inflammatory disease (PID) or a tubo-ovarian abscess. Tubal ligation does not eliminate the risk of PID, and does not offer protection against sexually transmitted infections.

==== Reduction of ovarian and fallopian tube cancer risk ====
Partial tubal ligation or full salpingectomy (a tubal ligation method that relies upon the physical removal of the fallopian tube) reduces the lifetime risk of developing ovarian or fallopian tube cancer later in life. This is true both for patients who are already known to be at high risk for ovarian or fallopian tube cancer secondary to genetic mutations, as well as females who have the baseline population risk.

== Risks and complications ==
=== Risks associated with surgery and anesthesia ===
Most tubal ligation procedures involve accessing the abdominal cavity through incisions in the abdominal wall and require some form of anesthesia. Major complications from laparoscopic surgery may include need for blood transfusion, infection, conversion to open surgery, or unplanned additional major surgery, while complications from anesthesia itself may include hypoventilation and cardiac arrest. Major complications during female sterilization are uncommon, occurring in an estimated 0.1–3.5% of laparoscopic procedures, with mortality rates in the United States estimated at 1–2 patient deaths per 100,000 procedures. These complications are more common for patients with a history of previous abdominal or pelvic surgery, obesity, and/or diabetes.

=== Failure ===
While female sterilization procedures are highly effective at preventing pregnancy, there is a small continuing risk of unintended pregnancy after tubal ligation. Several factors influence the likelihood of failure: increased time since sterilization, younger age at the time of sterilization, and certain methods of sterilization are all associated with increased risk of failure. Pregnancy rates at 10 years after sterilization vary depending on the type of procedure used, documented as low as 7.5 per 1,000 procedures to as high as 36.5 per 1,000 procedures.

=== Ectopic pregnancy ===
Overall, all pregnancies, including ectopic pregnancies, are less common among patients who have had a female sterilization procedure than among patients who have not. However, if patients do have a pregnancy after tubal ligation, a greater percentage of these will be ectopic; approximately one third of pregnancies that occur after a tubal ligation will be ectopic pregnancies. The likelihood of ectopic pregnancy is higher among patients sterilized before age 30 and differs depending on the type of sterilization procedure used.

=== Emotional after effects ===
The majority of patients who undergo female sterilization procedures do not regret their decisions. However, regret appears to be more common among patients who undergo sterilization at a young age (often defined as younger than 30 years old), patients who are unmarried at the time of sterilization, non-white patients, patients with public insurance such as Medicaid, or patients who undergo sterilization soon after the birth of a child. Regret has not been found to be associated with the number of children a person has at the time of sterilization.

=== Side effects ===
==== Menstrual changes ====
Patients who have undergone female sterilization procedures have minimal or no changes in their menstrual patterns. They were more likely to have perceived improvements in their menstrual cycle, including decreases in the amount of bleeding, in the number of days of bleeding, and in menstrual pain.

==== Ovarian reserve ====
Studies of hormone levels and ovarian reserve have demonstrated no significant changes after female sterilization, or inconsistent effects. Evidence does not indicate a strong association between tubal ligation and earlier onset of menopause.

==== Sexual function ====
Sexual function appears unchanged or improved after female sterilization compared with non-sterilized females.

==== Hysterectomy ====
Patients who had tubal occlusion surgeries have been found to be four to five times more likely to undergo hysterectomy later in life than those whose partners underwent vasectomy. There is no known biologic mechanism to support a causal relationship between tubal ligation and subsequent hysterectomy, but there is an association across all methods of tubal ligation.

==== Postablation tubal sterilization syndrome ====
Some patients who have undergone tubal ligation prior to an endometrial ablation procedure experience cyclic or intermittent pelvic pain; this may happen in up to 10% of women who have undergone both surgeries.

== Contraindications ==
Given its permanent nature, tubal ligation is contraindicated in patients who desire future pregnancy or who want to have the option of future pregnancy. In such cases, reversible methods of contraception are recommended.

Since most forms of tubal ligation require abdominal surgery under regional or general anesthesia, tubal ligation is also relatively contraindicated in patients for whom the risks of surgery and/or anesthesia are unacceptably high considering their other medical issues.

== Procedure technique ==
Tubal ligation through blocking or removing the tubes may be accomplished through an open abdominal surgery, a laparoscopic approach, or a hysteroscopic approach. Depending on the approach chosen, the patient will need to undergo local, general, or spinal (regional) anesthesia. The procedure may be performed either immediately after the end of a pregnancy, termed a "postpartum" or "postabortion tubal ligation", or more than six weeks after the end of a pregnancy, termed an "interval tubal ligation". The steps of the sterilization procedure will depend on the type of procedure being used. (See Tubal ligation methods below.)

If the patient chooses a postpartum tubal ligation, the procedure will further depend on the delivery method. If the patient delivers via Cesarean section, the surgeon will remove part or all of the fallopian tubes after the infant has been delivered and the uterus has been closed. Anesthesia for the tubal ligation will be the same as that being used for the Cesarean section itself, usually regional or general anesthesia. If the patient delivers vaginally and desires a postpartum tubal ligation, the surgeon will remove part or all of the fallopian tubes, usually one or two days after the birth, during the same hospitalization.

If the patient chooses an interval tubal ligation, the procedure will typically be performed under general anesthesia in a hospital setting. Most tubal ligations are accomplished laparoscopically, with an incision at the umbilicus and zero, one, or two smaller incisions in the lower sides of the abdomen. It is also possible to perform the surgery without a laparoscope, using larger abdominal incisions. It is also possible to perform an interval tubal ligation hysteroscopically, which may be performed under local anesthesia, moderate sedation, or full general anesthesia. While no methods of hysteroscopic sterilization are currently on the market in the United States as of 2019, the Essure and Adiana systems were previously used for hysteroscopic sterilization, and research trials are investigating new hysteroscopic approaches.

== Tubal ligation methods ==
There are a number of methods of removing or occluding the fallopian tubes, some of which rely on medical implants and devices.

=== Postpartum tubal ligation ===
Performed immediately after a delivery, this method removes a segment, or all, of both fallopian tubes. The most common techniques for partial bilateral salpingectomy are the Pomeroy or Parkland procedures. The ten year pregnancy rate is estimated at 7.5 pregnancies per 1000 procedures performed, and the ectopic pregnancy rate is estimated at 1.5 per 1000 procedures performed.

=== Interval tubal ligation ===
==== Bilateral salpingectomy ====
This method removes both tubes entirely, from the uterine cornuae out to the tubal fimbriae. This method has recently become more popular for female sterilization, given evidence to support the fallopian tube as the potential site of origin of some ovarian cancers. Some large medical systems such as Kaiser Permanente Northern California have endorsed complete bilateral salpingectomy as the preferred means of female sterilization and professional medical societies such as the Society of Gynecologic Oncology and the American College of Obstetricians and Gynecologists (ACOG) recommend discussing the benefits of salpingectomy during counseling for sterilization. While complete bilateral salpingectomy theoretically should have an efficacy rate that approaches 100 percent and eliminates the risk of tubal ectopic pregnancy, there is not high-quality data available comparing this method to older methods.

==== Bipolar coagulation ====
This method uses electric current to cauterize sections of the fallopian tube, with or without subsequent division of the tube. The ten year pregnancy rate is estimated at 6.3 to 24.8 pregnancies per 1000 procedures performed, and the ectopic pregnancy rate is estimated at 17.1 per 1000 procedures performed.

==== Monopolar coagulation ====
This method uses electric current to cauterize the tube, but also allows radiating current to further damage the tubes as it spreads from the coagulation site. The tubes may also be transected after cauterization. The ten year pregnancy rate is estimated at 7.5 pregnancies per 1000 procedures performed.

==== Tubal clip ====
This method uses a tubal clip (Filshie clip or Hulka clip) to permanently clip the fallopian tubes shut. Once applied and fastened, the clip blocks sperm and eggs from meeting in the fallopian tube. The ten year pregnancy rate is estimated at 36.5 pregnancies per 1000 procedures performed, and the ectopic pregnancy rate is estimated at 8.5 per 1000 procedures performed.

==== Tubal ring (Falope ring) ====
This method involves a doubling over of the fallopian tubes and application of a silastic band to the tube. The ten year pregnancy rate is estimated at 17.7 pregnancies per 1000 procedures performed, and the ectopic pregnancy rate is estimated at 8.5 per 1000 procedures performed.

=== Less commonly used or no longer used procedures ===
==== Irving's procedure ====
This method places two ligatures (sutures) around the fallopian tube and removes the segment of tube between the ligatures. The medial ends of the fallopian tubes on the side closer to the uterus are then connected to the back of the uterus itself.

==== Uchida tubal ligation ====
This method involves dissecting the fallopian tube from the overlying connective tissue (serosa), placing two ligatures, and excising a segment of the tube, then burying the end of the fallopian tube closest to the uterus underneath the serosa. Dr. Uchida reported no failures among 20,000 procedures.

==== Essure tubal ligation ====
This method closed the fallopian tubes through a hysteroscopic approach by placing two small metal and fiber coils in the fallopian tubes through the fallopian ostia. After insertion, scar tissue forms around the coils, blocking off the fallopian tubes and preventing sperm from reaching the egg. It was removed from the US market in 2019.

==== Adiana tubal ligation ====
This method closed the fallopian tubes through a hysteroscopic approach by placing two small silicone pieces in the fallopian tubes. During the procedure, the health care provider heats a small portion of each fallopian tube and then inserts a tiny piece of silicone into each tube. After the procedure, scar tissue formed around the silicone inserts, blocking off the fallopian tubes and preventing sperm from reaching the egg. It was removed from the US market in 2012.

== Reversal or in vitro fertilization after tubal ligation ==
All tubal ligation procedures are considered permanent and are not reliably reversible forms of birth control. Patients who wish to have the option of future pregnancy should ideally be directed towards effective but reversible forms of birth control, rather than sterilization procedures. Examples of this include intrauterine devices. However, patients who desire pregnancy after having undergone a female sterilization procedure have two options.

Tubal reversal is a type of microsurgery to repair the fallopian tube after a tubal ligation procedure. Successful pregnancy rates after reversal surgery are 42-69%, depending on the sterilization technique that was used.

Alternatively, in vitro fertilization (IVF) may allow patients with absent or occluded fallopian tubes to successfully carry a pregnancy. The choice of whether to attempt tubal reversal or move straight to IVF depends on individual patient factors, including the likelihood of successful tubal reversal surgery and the age of the patient.

== Recovery and rehabilitation ==
Most laparoscopic methods of interval tubal ligation are outpatient surgeries and do not require hospitalization overnight. Patients are counseled to expect some soreness but to expect to be ready to perform daily activities 1–2 days after surgery. Patients undergoing postpartum tubal ligations will not be delayed in their discharge from the hospital after birth, and recovery is not significantly different from normal postpartum recovery.

== History ==
The first modern female sterilization procedure was performed in 1880 by Dr. Samuel Lungren of Toledo, Ohio, in the United States. Hysteroscopic tubal ligation was developed later by Mikulicz-Radecki and Freund.

Since its development, female sterilization has been periodically performed on patients without their informed consent, often specifically targeting marginalized populations. Given this history of human rights abuses, current sterilization policy in the United States requires a mandatory waiting period for tubal sterilization on Medicaid beneficiaries. This waiting period is not required for private insurance beneficiaries, which has the effect of selectively restricting low-income women's access to tubal sterilization.

== Society and culture ==
=== Prevalence ===
Of the 64% of married or in-union women worldwide using some form of contraception, approximately one fifth (19% of all women) used female sterilization as their contraception, making it the most common contraceptive method globally. The percentage of women using female sterilization varies significantly between different regions of the world. Rates are highest in Asia, Latin America and the Caribbean, North America, Oceania, and selected countries in Western Europe, where rates of sterilization are often greater than 40%; rates in Africa, the Middle East, and parts of Eastern Europe, however, are significantly lower, sometimes less than 2%. An estimated 180 million women worldwide have undergone surgical sterilization, compared to approximately 42.5 million men who have undergone vasectomy.

In the United States, female sterilization is used by 30% of married couples and 22% of women who use any form of contraception, making it the second-most popular contraceptive after the birth control pill. Slightly more than 8.2 million women in the US use tubal ligation as their main form of contraception, and approximately 643,000 female sterilization procedures are performed each year in the United States. A September 2024 study found that states which enacted abortion bans following the ruling in Dobbs v. Jackson Women's Health Organization saw a 39% increase in tubal ligation rates by December 2022.

== See also ==
- Compulsory sterilization
