= Hariman Sanatorium =

- U.S. National Register of Historic Places
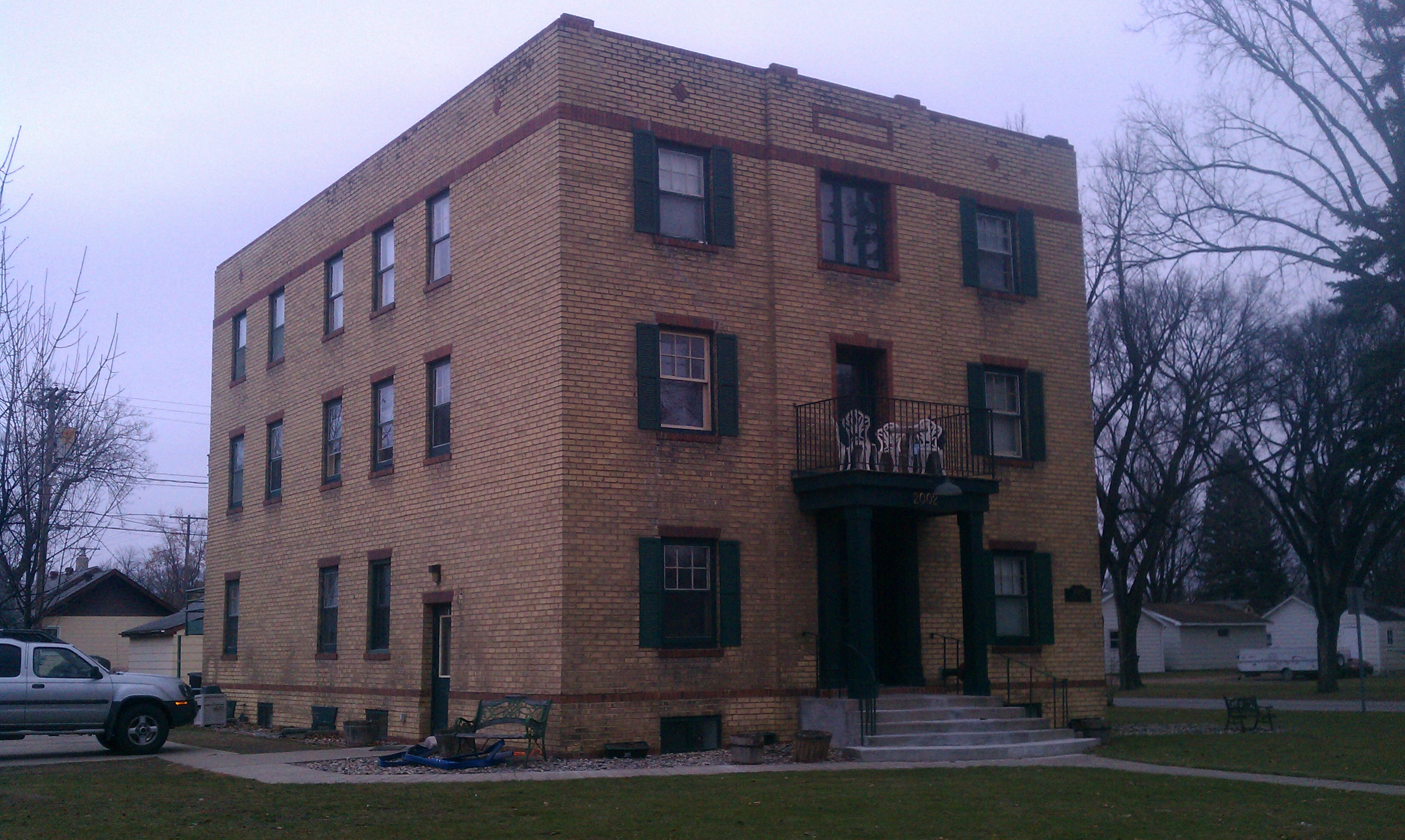

- Location within North Dakota Location within the United States
- Location: 2002 University Avenue, Grand Forks, North Dakota
- Coordinates: 47.92259°N 97.05563°W
- Built: July 6, 1928
- Architect: Thorvaldson-Johnson & George E Hariman
- Architectural style: 20th Century Modern Movement
- NRHP reference No.: 13000633
- Added to NRHP: August 28, 2013

Hariman Sanatorium was the first chiropractic hospital with both in-patient and out-patient care in the United States when it opened on July 6, 1928. It was built by George E. Hariman, DC in Grand Forks, North Dakota. He managed the hospital until his death in 1977. His son continued the practice for four more years until he sold the building to the University of North Dakota which used it to house the offices of Department of Anthropology. They sold it to a developer in 1999 who converted it into apartments.
