= Essure =

Permanent birth control method for women

Background
- Type: Sterilization
- First use: 2002

Failure rates (first year, after occlusion; data disputed)
- Perfect use: 0.26%
- Typical use: ?

Usage
- Duration effect: Permanent
- Reversibility: irreversible
- User reminders: Additional methods until 3 month check by hysterosalpingogram
- Clinic review: None

Advantages and disadvantages
- STI protection: No
- Benefits: Permanent contraception

Essure was a device for female sterilization. It is a metal coil which when placed into each fallopian tube induces fibrosis and blockage. Essure was designed as an alternative to tubal ligation. After multiple issues of women with the implant, Bayer did a black box warning followed by removal from the market in 2018, and the device is no longer sold due to complications secondary to its implantation. Because Bayer did not do a formal recall, implanted women were not notified of the problems and had to figure it out for themselves. The company has reported that several patients implanted with the Essure System for Permanent Birth Control have experienced and/or reported adverse effects, including: perforation of the uterus and/or fallopian tubes, identification of inserts in the abdominal or pelvic cavity, persistent pain, and suspected allergic or hypersensitivity reaction. Although designed to remain in place for a lifetime, it was approved based on short-term safety studies. Of the 745 women with implants in the original premarket studies, 92% were followed up at one year, and 25% for two years, for safety outcomes. A 2009 review concluded that Essure appeared safe and effective based on short-term studies, that it was less invasive and could be cheaper than laparoscopic bilateral tubal ligation. About 750,000 women have received the device worldwide.

Initial trials found about 4% of women had tubal perforation, expulsion, or misplacement of the device at the time of the procedure. Since 2013, the product has been controversial, with thousands of women reporting severe side effects leading to surgical extraction. Rates of repeat surgery in the first year were ten times greater with Essure than with tubal ligation. Campaigner Erin Brockovich has been hosting a website where women can share their stories after having the procedure. As of 2015 many adverse events, including tubal perforations, intractable pain and bleeding leading to hysterectomies, possible device-related deaths, and hundreds of unintended pregnancies occurred, according to the US FDA adverse events database and other studies.

It was developed by Conceptus Inc. and approved for use in the United States in 2002. Conceptus was acquired by Bayer AG of Germany in June 2013. In 2017, the CE marking in the European Union, and thus the commercial license for Essure was suspended for at least three months. Authorities in France and Ukraine recalled the implants, and the manufacturer withdrew the product voluntarily in Canada, the UK, Finland, and the Netherlands. In April 2018, the FDA restricted sale and use of Essure which resulted in a 70% decrease in sales. In July 2018 Bayer announced the halt of sales in the U.S. by the end of 2018. The device is featured in the 2018 Netflix documentary The Bleeding Edge.

== Use ==
A 2015 review found the effectiveness of Essure is unclear due to the low quality of evidence. With perfect use another review found evidence of a 99.8% effective based on 5 years of follow-up.

The reported insertional failure rates are "failure to place 2 inserts in the first procedure (5%), initial tubal patency (3.5%), expulsion (2.2%), perforation (1.8%), or other unsatisfactory device location (0.6%)". Upon follow-up, occlusion was observed to have occurred in 96.5% of patients at 3 months with the remainder occluded by 6 months. A 2015 study published in the BMJ concluded that Essure was as efficacious as laparoscopic sterilization at preventing pregnancy, but with a "10-fold higher risk of undergoing re-operation" when compared to patients who underwent a laparoscopic sterilization procedure.

=== Follow-up ===
For the Essure method, three months after insertion a radiologist is supposed to perform a fluoroscopic procedure called a hysterosalpingogram, to confirm that the fallopian tubes are completely blocked and that the woman can rely on the Essure inserts for birth control. A contrast agent (dye) is injected through the cervix, and an x-ray technologist takes photos of the Essure coils to ensure no contrast leaks past the Essure.

== Adverse effects ==
Serious side effects may include persistent pain, perforation of the uterus and fallopian tubes, and migration of the coils into the pelvis or abdomen.

Because of the stainless steel medical staff need to be notified before magnetic resonance imaging (MRI) can be performed. However, the inserts were found to be safe with MRI using a 3-tesla magnet and is considered MR-conditional.

=== Risks ===
==== Procedural complications ====
- Inability to place inserts (4%)
- Cramping (30%)
- Pain (13%)
- Nausea/vomiting (11%)
- Dizziness/light headed (9%)
- Bleeding/spotting (7%)
- Vasovagal response (fainting) (1.3%)
- Perforation, expulsion, or other unsatisfactory location of the insert

==== Long-term complications ====
Sources:

- Abdominal pain (3.8%)
- Back pain (9%)
- Menstrual cramps, severe (2.9%)
- Pelvic or lower abdominal pain, severe (2.5%)
- Gas/bloating (1.3%)
- Headache (2.5%)
- Heavier menstrual bleeding (1.9%)
- Vaginal discharge or infection (1.5%)
- Pregnancy (0.48%) and increased risk of ectopic pregnancy
- Allergic reaction to the materials
- Rash
- Autoimmune disease (0.99%)
- Weight changes
- Depression
- Hair loss
- Suicide attempt (0.55%)

== Procedure ==
A physician places the coils into the fallopian tubes by a catheter passed from the vagina through the cervix and uterus. This occurs successfully between 63% and 100% of the time. Once in place, the ingrowth continues over a period of three months, resulting in blockage in the Fallopian tubes; the tissue barrier formed is supposed to prevent sperm from reaching an egg. During that intervening three-month period, women are advised to use an alternate contraceptive method.

Unlike tubal ligation, it may not require a general anaesthetic (though is often done under general anaesthetic). Despite this, some women have reported considerable pain during the procedure.

In one 2007 prospective study, the mean time for procedure was 6.8 minutes (range = 5–18 minutes) for a trained physician to perform. The procedure can be performed in a physician's office.

The procedure is reported to be permanent and not reversible by the manufacturer. Nevertheless, several Essure reversals have been performed.

=== Device ===
The small, flexible inserts are made from polyester fibers, nickel-titanium, stainless steel and solder. The insert contains inner polyethylene terephthalate fibers to induce inflammation, causing a benign fibrotic ingrowth, and is held in place by flexible stainless steel inner coil and a dynamic outer nickel titanium alloy coil. Unlike temporary methods of birth control, the Essure inserts do not contain or release hormones. The inserts do not prevent the transmission of sexually transmitted infections.

== Regulatory history ==
A Facebook group called Essure Problems which had 33,140 members (as of 04/03/2017) called the method "E-hell" and mentioned mostly pain, bleeding, bloating and other side effects from the device. Some women had coils break and perforate their internal organs, or conceived and gave birth to a child, at a number well above what Bayer has been reporting. Erin Brockovich became involved in the controversy and hosts a website where women can share their stories after having the procedure. Since then Bayer provided two toll-free telephone numbers for patient complaints, has advised that women reporting adverse effects are "consistent with clinical trials and consistent with what the FDA is seeing", and further insisted that it wanted to hear from any women experiencing problems with Essure.

In April 2015, a group of six delegates from the Essure Problems group, including a doctor with Essure experience, spoke before 36 members of the FDA and the Congressional HELP committee regarding a citizen's petition filed with the FDA. The FDA began investigating the claims of then over 16,000 members of the group as well as the legalities of the approval process that Essure went through. As of 2015, one postmarketing study was not published for 13 years after the device was approved, and another postmarketing study had not been published as of 2015.

=== FDA ===
The product was approved by the FDA in 2002. In 2013, the product made news in North America, with women complaining of severe side effects leading to surgical extraction. According to one article, women who have gotten pregnant are naming these children e-babies.

In October 2013, the FDA stated that since the product was approved in 2002 it had received 943 reports of adverse events related to Essure, mainly for pain (606 of the complaints). An additional 1,000 more complaints have been sent to the FDA in a voluntary reporting system, but physicians are not obliged to report complaints.

In June 2015, the FDA reported an investigation into Essure and its over 5000 complaints, seven reported deaths, and many additional side effects, all linked to Essure, its specific chemical composition, its improper placement and its insertion. The agency announced that its Obstetrics and Gynecology Devices Panel would conduct an evidence-based review of Essure's safety in September 2015 due to the rise in adverse event reports from only 950 reports between 2002 through October 2013, to more than 4,150, or 81 percent of the total, from October 2013 to June 2015.

In February 2016, the FDA issued a "black box" label to warn the public about the harmful complications associated with the use of this device and requested Bayer to conduct a new postmarket surveillance to follow 2,000 women for at least three years, comparing the effectiveness and safety of the device with other surgical contraceptive methods. Women and doctors were required to sign a decision checklist before Essure implantation, and to give consent to a test three months later to ensure the device was properly placed and functioning.

In July 2020, Bayer published interim data from the FDA-mandated postmarket surveillance study comparing patients who received Essure to those who receiving a laparoscopic tubal ligation. The interim data reported the incidence of several side effects in each group. In Essure patients, chronic lower abdominal or pelvic pain occurred in 9% and abnormal bleeding in 16%, compared to 4.5% reporting pain and 10% with abnormal bleeding in the tubal ligation group. It also reported new allergic or hypersensitivity reactions in 22% of patients and no reports of new autoimmune disorders, although blinded independent verification was pending. Recruitment of patients receiving Essure into the postmarket surveillance study has ceased as the device is no longer available on the US market.

== Legal issues ==
In August 2020, Bayer agreed to a US$1.6 billion settlement to resolve approximately 90% of the nearly 39,000 U.S. claims related to Essure. Bayer stated that the settlement did not imply any admission of wrongdoing or liability.

In 2023, the device was the subject of a class action lawsuit in Australia. Over 1000 women joined the suit claiming that the device caused pain, suffering, and significant bleeding. The suit was dismissed in December 2024.

== See also ==
- Dalkon Shield
