= Sterilization (medicine) =

Medical technique that intentionally leaves a person unable to reproduce

Background
- Type: Sterilization (tubal ligation, salpingectomy, hysterectomy, vasoligation)
- First use: Ancient

Failure rates (first year)
- Perfect use: under 1%
- Typical use: under 1%

Usage
- Duration effect: Permanent
- Reversibility: Difficult and expensive, vasectomy reversal & tubal reversal may be possible
- User reminders: 3 negative semen samples required following vasectomy
- Clinic review: None

Advantages and disadvantages
- STI protection: None
- Benefits: Permanent methods that require no further user actions
- Risks: Operative and postoperative complications

Sterilization (also spelled sterilisation) is any of several medical methods of permanent birth control that intentionally leaves a person unable to reproduce. Sterilization methods are available for both males and females. Although a non-surgical option for females (Essure) was available until 2019, it is no longer an option. Sterilization procedures are intended to be permanent; reversal is generally difficult.

There are multiple ways of having sterilization done. The two that are used most frequently are salpingectomy or tubal ligation for women and vasectomy for men. There are many different ways tubal sterilization can be accomplished. It is highly effective, like use of an IUD or arm implant, and in the United States, surgical complications are low. With that being said, tubal ligation is still a method that involves surgery, so there is still a danger. Women who choose tubal ligation have a higher risk of serious side effects than men who have a vasectomy. Pregnancies after tubal ligation can still occur, even many years after the procedure. Some recent studies have estimated that 3% of women become pregnant after tubal ligation. It is not very likely, but if it does happen, there is a high risk of ectopic gestation. Tubal sterilization surgeries can be performed during a Cesarean section or shortly after a vaginal delivery mostly by mini-laparotomy. In some cases, sterilization can be reversed, but this can not be guaranteed. If a person might want to become pregnant in the future, they are advised not to have this surgery.

Sterilization procedures can be undertaken voluntarily or promoted by governments. The legal framework surrounding sterilizations varies significantly between countries. In some cases, governments have historically or presently implemented compulsory or incentivized sterilization programs. On the other hand, certain nations have enacted laws that restrict or prohibit the practice.

== Methods ==
=== Surgical ===
Surgical sterilization methods include:

- Tubal ligation in females, known popularly as "having one's tubes tied". The fallopian tubes, which allow the sperm to fertilize the ovum and carry the fertilized ovum to the uterus, are closed. This typically involves a general anesthetic and a laparotomy or laparoscopic approach to cut, clip, or cauterize the fallopian tubes.
- Bilateral salpingectomy in females, also known as tubal removal. Both fallopian tubes are surgically removed. When done for contraceptive purposes, the ovaries are left in place. This method is considered more effective than tubal ligation as there is no chance of tubal reconnection or clip failure. It also prevents cancer of the fallopian tubes and can reduce the risk of ovarian cancer.
- Vasoligation in males. The vasa deferentia, the tubes that connect the testicles to the prostate, are cut and closed. This prevents sperm produced in the testicles from entering the ejaculated semen (which is mostly produced in the seminal vesicles and prostate). Although the term vasectomy is established in the general community, the correct medical terminology is vasoligation.
- Hysterectomy in females is not offered for contraception, but is done to manage heavy menstrual bleeding or cancer. The uterus is surgically removed, permanently preventing future pregnancy and some diseases, such as uterine cancer.
- Castration in males is not offered as a form of human contraception, but is sometimes done if there are concerns of cancer that mean the testicles should be surgically removed. This is frequently used for the sterilization of animals but rarely for humans. It was also formerly used on some human male children for other reasons; see castrato and eunuch.

=== Transluminal ===
Transluminal procedures are performed by entry through the female reproductive tract. These generally use a catheter to place a substance into the fallopian tubes that eventually causes a blockage of the tract in this segment. Such procedures are normally referred to as non-surgical because they use natural orifices and thereby do not necessitate any surgical incision.

- The Essure procedure was one such transluminal sterilization technique. In this procedure, polyethylene terephthalate fiber inserts were placed into the fallopian tubes, eventually inducing scarring and occlusion of the tubes.

In April 2018, the FDA restricted the sale and use of Essure due to several complications certain women experienced. On July 20, 2018, Bayer announced it would end sales in the US by the end of 2018.

- Quinacrine has also been used for transluminal sterilization, but despite a multitude of clinical studies on the use of quinacrine and female sterilization, no randomized, controlled trials have been reported to date, and there is some controversy over its use. See also mepacrine.

=== Pharmacological ===
There are no oral medications for sterilization currently approved for human use.

== Effects ==
The effects of sterilization vary greatly according to gender, age, location, and other factors. When discussing female sterilization, one of the most important factors to consider is the degree of power that women hold in the household and within society.

=== Physical ===
Understanding the physical effects of sterilization is important because it is a common method of contraception. Among women who had interval tubal sterilization, studies have shown a null or positive effect on female sexual interest and pleasure. Similar results were discovered for men who had vasectomies. Vasectomies did not negatively influence the satisfaction of men, and there was no significant change in communication and marital satisfaction among couples as a result. According to Johns Hopkins Medicine, tubal sterilizations result in serious problems in less than 1 out of 1000 women. Tubal sterilization is an effective procedure, but pregnancy can still occur in about 1 out of 200 women. Some potential risks of tubal sterilization include "bleeding from a skin incision or inside the abdomen, infection, damage to other organs inside the abdomen, side effects from anesthesia, ectopic pregnancy (an egg that becomes fertilized outside the uterus), [and] incomplete closing of a fallopian tube that results in pregnancy." Potential risks of vasectomies include "pain continuing long after surgery, bleeding and bruising, a (usually mild) inflammatory reaction to sperm that spill during surgery called sperm granuloma, [and] infection." Additionally, the vas deferens, the part of the male anatomy that transports sperm, may grow back together, which could result in unintended pregnancy.

=== Psychological ===
It can be difficult to measure the psychological effects of sterilization, as certain psychological phenomena may be more prevalent in those who eventually decide to partake in sterilization. The relationships between psychological problems and sterilization may be due more to correlation rather than causation. That being said, there are several trends surrounding the psychological health of those who have undergone sterilization. A 1996 Chinese study found that "risk for depression was 2.34 times greater after tubal ligation, and 3.97 times greater after vasectomy." If an individual goes into the procedure after being coerced or with a lack of understanding of the procedure and its consequences, they are more likely to develop negative psychological consequences afterward. However, most people in the United States who are sterilized maintain the same level of psychological health as they did before the procedure. Because sterilization is a largely irreversible procedure, post-sterilization regret is a major psychological effect. The most common reason for post-sterilization regret is the desire to have more children.

=== Familial ===
==== Women in the household ====
Some people believe that sterilization gives women, in particular, more control over their sexuality and their reproduction. This can empower women, give them a sense of ownership of their bodies, and improve their relationship with the household. In the United States, where there are no governmental incentives for being sterilized (see below), the decision is often made for personal and familial reasons. A woman, sometimes along with her partner, can decide that she does not want any more children or she does not want children at all. Many women report feeling more sexually liberated after being sterilized, as there is no risk of pregnancy. By eliminating the risk of having more children, a woman can commit to a long-term job without a disruption of maternity leave in the future. A woman will feel more empowered since she can make a decision about her body and her life. Sterilization eliminates the need for potential abortions, which can be a very stressful decision overall.

==== Relationship with spouse ====
In countries that are more entrenched in the traditional patriarchal system, female sterilizations can inspire abusive behavior from husbands for various reasons. Sterilization can lead to distrust in a marriage if the husband suspects his wife of infidelity. Furthermore, the husband may become angry and aggressive if the decision to be sterilized is made by the wife without consulting him. If a woman marries again after sterilization, her new husband might be displeased with her inability to bear him children, causing tumult in the marriage. There are many negative consequences associated with women who hold very little personal power. However, in more progressive cultures and in stable relationships, there are few changes observed in spousal relationships after sterilization. In these cultures, women hold more agency, and men are less likely to dictate women's personal choices. Sexual activity remains fairly constant, and marital relationships do not suffer, as long as the sterilization decision was made collaboratively between the two partners.

==== Children ====
As the Chinese government tried to communicate to their people after the population boom between 1953 and 1971, having fewer children allows more of a family's total resources to be dedicated to each child. Especially in countries that give parents incentives for family planning and for having fewer children, it is advantageous to existing children to be in smaller families. In more rural areas where families depend on the labor of their children to survive, sterilization could have more of a negative effect. If a child dies, a family loses a worker. During China's controversial one-child policy reign, policymakers allowed families to have another child if an existing child in the same family died or became disabled. However, if either parent is sterilized, this is impossible. The loss of a child could impact the survival of an entire family.

== Voluntary (elective) sterilization ==
Motivations for voluntary sterilizations include:

=== Lifestyle ===
Because of the emphasis placed on childbearing as the most important role of women, not having children was traditionally seen as a deficiency or due to fertility problems. However, better access to contraception, new economic and educational opportunities, and changing ideas about motherhood have led to new reproductive experiences for women in the United States, particularly for women who choose to be childless. Scholars define "voluntarily childless" women as "women of childbearing age who are fertile and state that they do not intend to have children, women of childbearing age who have chosen sterilization, or women past childbearing age who were fertile but chose not to have children".

In industrialized countries such as the United Kingdom, those of Western Europe, and the United States, the fertility rate has declined below or near the population replacement rate of two children per woman. Women are having children at a later age, and most notably, an increasing number of women are choosing not to bear children at all. According to the U.S. Census Bureau's American Community Survey, 46% of women aged 15 to 44 were childless in June 2008 compared to 35% of childless women in 1976. The personal freedoms of a childless lifestyle and the ability to focus on other relationships were common motivations underlying the decision to be voluntarily childless. Such personal freedoms included increased autonomy and improved financial positions.

In relationships, the couple could engage in more spontaneous activities because they did not need a babysitter or to consult with someone else. Women had more time to devote to their careers and hobbies. Regarding other relationships, some women chose to forgo children because they wanted to maintain the "type of intimacy that they found fulfilling" with their partners. Although voluntary childlessness was a joint decision for many couples, "studies have found that women were more often the primary decision makers. There is also some evidence that when one partner (either male or female) was ambivalent, a strong desire not to have children on the side of the other partner was often the deciding factor." 'Not finding a suitable partner at an appropriate time in life' was another deciding factor, particularly for ambivalent women.

=== Financial ===
Economic incentives and career reasons also motivate women to choose sterilization. Regarding women who are voluntarily childless, studies show that there are higher "opportunity costs" for women of higher socioeconomic status because women are more likely than men to forfeit labor force participation once they have children. Some women stated the lack of financial resources as a reason they remained childfree. Combined with the cost of raising children, having children was viewed as a negative impact on financial resources. Thus, childlessness is generally correlated with working full-time. "Many women expressed the view that women ultimately have to make a choice between motherhood and career." In contrast, childlessness was also found among adults who were not overly committed to careers. Here, the importance of leisure time and the potential to retire early were emphasized over career ambitions.

Sterilization is also an option for low-income families. Public funding for contraceptive services comes from a variety of federal and state sources in the United States. Until the mid-1990s, "[f]ederal funds for contraceptive services [were] provided under Title X of the Public Health Service Act, Title XIX of the Social Security (Medicaid), and two block-grant programs, Maternal and Child Health (MCH) and Social Services." The Temporary Assistance for Needy Families was another federal block grant created in 1996 and is the main federal source of financial "welfare" aid. The U.S. Department of Health and Human Services administers Title X as the sole federal program dedicated to family planning. Under Title X, public and nonprofit private agencies receive grants to operate clinics that provide care largely to the uninsured and underinsured. Unlike Title X, Medicaid is an entitlement program that is jointly funded by federal and state governments to "provide medical care to various low-income populations". Medicaid provided the majority of publicly funded sterilizations. In 1979, regulations were implemented on sterilizations funded by the Department of Health and Human Services. The regulations included "a complex procedure to ensure women's informed consent, a 30-day waiting period between consent and the procedure, and a prohibition on sterilization of anyone younger than 21 or who is mentally incompetent."

=== Physiological ===
Physiological reasons, such as disease, genetic disorders, or disabilities, can influence whether individuals seek sterilization. For example, females may choose to undergo sterilization procedures as a form of treatment for certain diseases. In individuals with endometriosis, a hysterectomy, sometimes along with an oophorectomy, may be a viable treatment option, although it is often a last resort. Another reason may include individuals who choose sterilization to concentrate on caring for a child with a disability and to avoid withholding any necessary resources from additional children. For individuals without children, technological advancements have enabled the use of carrier screening and prenatal testing for the detection of genetic disorders in prospective parents or their unborn offspring. If prenatal testing has detected a genetic disorder in the child, parents may opt to be sterilized to forgo having more children who may also be affected.

=== Barriers to elective sterilization ===
Individuals who desire to undergo elective sterilization may face barriers to accessing these procedures. In the United States, there has been a growing demand for sterilization procedures, especially among women. This is thought to be at least partially due to the Supreme Court's decision to overturn Roe v. Wade in 2022, leaving the fate of abortion rights uncertain. However, due to skepticism from medical providers, cost, and insurance issues, many individuals desiring sterilization have been denied or prevented from undergoing the procedures. Patients of childbearing age without children report difficulty in finding physicians who are willing to perform sterilizations. In the United States, insurance companies differ in the extent to which they cover sterilization procedures. Under the Affordable Care Act, FDA-approved female sterilization procedures are covered when prescribed by a physician. However, male reproductive procedures, like vasectomies, are not required to be covered. These differing levels of coverage may create cost barriers, preventing some individuals desiring sterilization procedures from accessing them.

In the United States, men also encounter barriers when seeking elective sterilization procedures, particularly vasectomies. Despite being a safe and effective form of birth control, the U.S. has the lowest vasectomy rate among wealthy nations. This can be attributed to both cultural attitudes and structural obstacles within the healthcare system. Misinformation continues to surround the procedure, such as the misconception that a vasectomy undermines masculinity, contributing to hesitation and stigma. At the same time, systemic barriers further limit access. Insurance limitations and provider attitudes often restrict who can undergo the procedure. Because vasectomies are not covered under the Affordable Care Act (ACA), men may face out-of-pocket costs of up to $1,000. Additionally, while any man over 18 is legally eligible, some providers refuse to perform the procedure on younger patients or those without children, creating another barrier for those seeking sterilization.

=== National examples ===
==== United States ====
Sterilization is the most common form of contraception in the United States when female and male usage is combined. However, usage varies across demographic categories such as gender, age, education, etc. According to the Centers for Disease Control and Prevention, 16.7% of women aged 15–44 used female sterilization as a method of contraception in 2006–2008, while 6.1% of their partners used male sterilization. Minority women were more likely to use female sterilization than their white counterparts. The proportion of women using female sterilization was highest for black women (22%), followed by Hispanic women (20%), and white women (15%). Reverse sterilization trends by race occurred for the male partners of the women: 8% of male partners of white women used male sterilization, but it dropped to 3% of the partners of Hispanic women and only 1% of the partners of black women. White women were more likely to rely on male sterilization and the pill. While use of the pill declined with age, the report found that female sterilization increased with age.

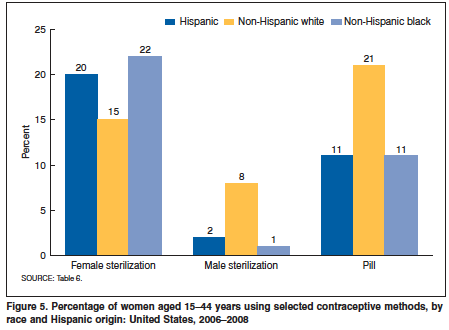
U.S. Sterilization by Race chart

Correspondingly, female sterilization was the leading method among currently and formerly married women; the pill was the leading method among cohabiting and never married women. 59% of women with three or more children used female sterilization. Thus, women who do not intend to have more children primarily rely on this method of contraception in contrast with women who only aim to space or delay their next birth. Regarding education, "less-educated women aged 22–44 years were much more likely to rely on female sterilization than those with more education." For example, female sterilization was used among 55% of women who had not completed high school compared with 16% of women who had graduated from college.

Because national surveys of contraceptive methods have generally relied on the input of women, information about male sterilization is not as widespread. A survey using data from the 2002 National Survey of Family Growth found similar trends to those reported for female sterilization by the Centers for Disease Control and Prevention in 2006–2008. Among men aged 15–44 years, vasectomy prevalence was highest in older men and those with two or more biological children. Men with less education were more likely to report female sterilization in their partner. In contrast to female sterilization trends, vasectomy was associated with white males and those who had ever visited a family planning clinic.

Several factors can explain the different findings between female and male sterilization trends in the United States. Women are more likely to receive reproductive health services. "Additionally, overall use of contraception is associated with higher socioeconomic status, but for women, use of contraceptive tubal sterilization has been found to be related to lower socioeconomic status and lack of health insurance." This finding could be related to Medicaid-funded sterilizations in the postpartum period that are not available to men.

== Promoted sterilization ==
=== Compulsory ===
Compulsory sterilization, including forcible and involuntary sterilization, refers to governmental policies put in place as part of human population planning or as a form of eugenics (changing hereditary qualities of a race or breed by controlling mating) to prevent certain groups of people from reproducing. In certain countries, some women were sterilized without their consent, which later resulted in lawsuits against the doctors who performed those surgeries. There are also many examples of women being asked for their consent to the procedure during times of high stress and physical pain. Some examples include women who have just given birth and are still being affected by the drugs, women in the middle of labor, or people who do not understand English. Many of the women affected by this were poor, minority women.

In May 2014, the World Health Organization, OHCHR, UN Women, UNAIDS, UNDP, UNFPA, and UNICEF issued a joint statement on Eliminating forced, coercive and otherwise involuntary sterilization, An interagency statement. The report references the involuntary sterilization of several specific population groups. They include:

- Women, especially in relation to coercive population control policies, particularly including women living with HIV, Indigenous and ethnic minority girls and women. Indigenous and ethnic minority women often face "wrongful stereotyping based on gender, race, and ethnicity".
- People with disabilities are often perceived as sexually inactive. Women with intellectual disabilities are "often treated as if they have no control, or should have no control, over their sexual and reproductive choices". Other rationales include menstrual management for the benefit of careers.
- Intersex persons, who "are often subjected to cosmetic and other non-medically indicated surgeries performed on their reproductive organs, without their informed consent or that of their parents, and without taking into consideration the views of the children involved", often as a "sex-normalizing" treatment.
- Transgender persons, "as a prerequisite to receiving gender-affirmative treatment and gender-marker changes".

The report recommends a range of guiding principles for medical treatment, including ensuring patient autonomy in decision-making, ensuring non-discrimination, accountability, and access to remedies.

=== Incentivizing ===
Some governments in the world have offered and continue to provide economic incentives to use birth control, including sterilization. In countries with high population growth and insufficient resources to sustain a large population, these incentives become more enticing. Many of these policies are aimed at certain target groups, often disadvantaged and young women (especially in the United States). While these policies are controversial, the ultimate goal is to promote greater social well-being for the whole community. One of the theories supporting incentivizing or subsidy programs in the United States is that it offers contraception to citizens who may not be able to afford it. This can help families prevent unwanted pregnancies and avoid the financial, familial, and personal stresses of having children if they so desire. Sterilization becomes controversial when considering the degree of a government's involvement in personal decisions. For instance, some have posited that by offering incentives to receive sterilization, the government may change the decision of the families, rather than just supporting a decision they had already made. Some critics argue that incentive programs are inherently coercive, which makes them unethical. In contrast, proponents argue that as long as potential users of these programs are well-educated about the procedure, taught about alternative methods of contraception, and can make voluntary, informed consent, then incentive programs are providing a good service that is available for people to take advantage of.

=== National examples ===
==== United States ====
The United States is an example of a country that once implemented eugenic sterilization laws and practices. White American eugenicists promoted involuntary sterilization as a means of ensuring white supremacy by preventing so-called "race suicide." Therefore, eugenic policies in America often targeted Latinos, African Americans, Native Americans, people with disabilities, and poor whites. The first involuntary sterilization law was enacted in Indiana in 1907, later followed by a Supreme Court ruling in 1927 that legalized the practice nationwide. The 1927 Supreme Court decision in Buck v. Bell ruled that a state could perform forcible sterilization procedures on those deemed unfit for reproduction. As a result of this ruling, an estimated 70,000 Americans were forcibly sterilized. Until 1970, 30 states had enacted eugenic sterilization practices. Both men and women were subjected to sterilization, with vasectomy being the most common procedure for men, and women often subjected to a salpingectomy, a comparatively more invasive procedure. These eugenic sterilizations had the greatest impacts on people with mental illness, intellectual disabilities, and people of color. In addition, states varied in the extent to which they employed these practices, with California operating one of the largest eugenic sterilization programs in the country. Beginning in 1909, California executed approximately one-third of the nation's eugenic sterilizations. Under California law, sterilization was permitted for individuals in hospitals and state homes who were classified as "feebleminded." These laws disproportionately targeted people of Latin American heritage, especially women and girls. By the late 1930s, the practice of widespread eugenic sterilization in the United States began to decline, with further declines following the 1942 Supreme Court Ruling in Skinner v. Oklahoma. However, the Buck v. Bell ruling has never been explicitly overturned.

==== Japan ====
Japan's Race Eugenic Protection Law required citizens with mental disorders to be sterilized. This policy was active from 1940 until 1996, when it and all other eugenic policies in Japan were abolished. In many cases, sterilization policies were not explicitly compulsory in that they required consent. However, this meant that men and women were often coerced into agreeing to the procedure without being in the right state of mind or receiving all of the necessary information. Under the Japanese leprosy policies, citizens with leprosy were not forced into being sterilized; however, they had been placed involuntarily into segregated and quarantined communities.

==== Singapore ====
Singapore is an example of a country with a sterilization incentive program. In the 1980s, Singapore offered US $5000 to women who elected to be sterilized. The conditions associated with receiving this grant were clearly aimed at targeting low-income and less-educated parents. It specified that both parents should be below a specified educational level and that their combined income should not exceed $750 per month. This program, among other birth control incentives and education programs, greatly reduced Singapore's birth rate, female mortality rate, and infant mortality rate while increasing family income, female participation in the labor force, and a rise in educational attainment, among other social benefits. These are the intended results of most incentivizing programs, although questions of their ethicality remain.

==== India ====
Another country with an overpopulation problem is India. Medical advances in the past fifty years have lowered the death rate, resulting in large population density and overcrowding. This overcrowding is also a result of poor families' lack of access to birth control. Despite this lack of access, sterilization incentives have been in place since the mid-1900s. In the 1960s, the governments of three Indian states and one large private company offered free vasectomies to some employees, occasionally accompanied by a bonus. In 1959, the second Five-Year Plan offered medical practitioners who performed vasectomies on low-income men monetary compensation. Additionally, those who motivated men to receive vasectomies, and those men who did, received compensation. These incentives partially served as a way to educate men that sterilization was the most effective form of contraception and that vasectomies did not affect sexual performance. The incentives were only available to low-income men. Men were the target of sterilization because of the ease and quickness of the procedure, as compared to the sterilization of women. However, mass sterilization efforts resulted in a lack of cleanliness and careful technique, potentially resulting in botched surgeries and other complications. As the fertility rate began to decrease (but not quickly enough), more incentives were offered, such as land and fertilizer. In 1976, compulsory sterilization policies were put in place, and some disincentive programs were created to encourage more people to become sterilized. However, these disincentive policies, along with "sterilization camps" (where large amounts of sterilizations were performed quickly and often unsafely), were not received well by the population and gave people less incentive to participate in sterilization. The compulsory laws were removed. Further problems arose, and by 1981, there was a noticeable problem in the preference for sons. Since families were encouraged to keep the number of children to a minimum, son preference meant that female fetuses or young girls were killed at a rapid rate. The focus of population policies has changed in the twenty-first century. The government is more concerned with empowering women, protecting them from violence, and providing necessities to families. Sterilization efforts are still in existence and still target poor families.

==== China ====
When the People's Republic of China came to power in 1949, the Chinese government viewed population growth as a sign of development and progress. The population at the time was around 540 million. Therefore, abortion and sterilization were restricted. With these policies and the social and economic improvements associated with the new regime, rapid population growth ensued. By the end of the Cultural Revolution in 1971, and with a population of 850 million, population control became a top priority of the government. Within six years, more than thirty million sterilizations were performed on men and women. Soon, the well-known one-child policy was enforced, which came along with many incentives for parents to maintain a one-child family. This included free books, materials, and food for the child through primary school if both parents agreed to sterilization. The policy also had harsh consequences for violating the one-child limit. For example, in Shanghai, parents with "extra children" must pay between three and six times the city's average yearly income in "social maintenance fees". In the past decade, the restrictions on family size and reproduction have lessened. The Chinese government has found that by giving incentives and disincentives that are more far-reaching than a one-time incentive to be sterilized, families are more willing to practice better family planning. These policies seem to be less coercive as well, as families are better able to see the long-term effects of their sterilization rather than being tempted with a one-time sum.

== Criminalization ==
Certain countries have enacted legislation prohibiting or restricting elective sterilization procedures for contraceptive purposes.

=== Poland ===
In Poland, reproductive sterilization of men or women has been defined as a criminal act since 1997 and remains so as of 5 September 2019, under Article 156 §1, which also covers making someone blind, deaf or mute, of the 1997 law. The original 1997 law punished contraventions with a prison sentence of one to ten years, and the updated law as of 5 September 2019 sets a prison sentence of at least 3 years. The prison sentence is a maximum of three years if the sterilization is involuntary, under Art. 156 §2.

== See also ==
- Infertility
- Eugenics
- Male contraceptive
- Vasectomy and Vas-occlusive contraception (male sterilization)
- Tubal ligation (form of female sterilization)
- Legal status of human sterilization by country
