= Long Island Bank =

- Industry: Banking
- Founded: April 1, 1824; 202 years ago
- Headquarters: Brooklyn, New York

The Long Island Bank was the first bank in Brooklyn, New York.

== History ==
In the early 1820s, Brooklyn was the 16th largest inhabited place in the United States; however, Brooklyn had no bank and no insurance company.

In 1824, the bank was incorporated and became the first bank in Brooklyn. The initial capital of the bank was $300,000 in $50 shares. Bank notes were issued from 3 August 1824. Its offices were at 7 Front Street in Brooklyn. The first President was Leffert Lefferts.

In 1867, William S. Herriman, president of the bank, died and was replaced by William C. Fowler.

In 1877 Judge Landon of Schenectady instructed the Long Island Savings Bank trustees to wind up the affairs of the bank, with payments to start December 14, 1877.
