= Dr. O.B. Harriman House =

Historic house in Iowa, United States

- U.S. National Register of Historic Places
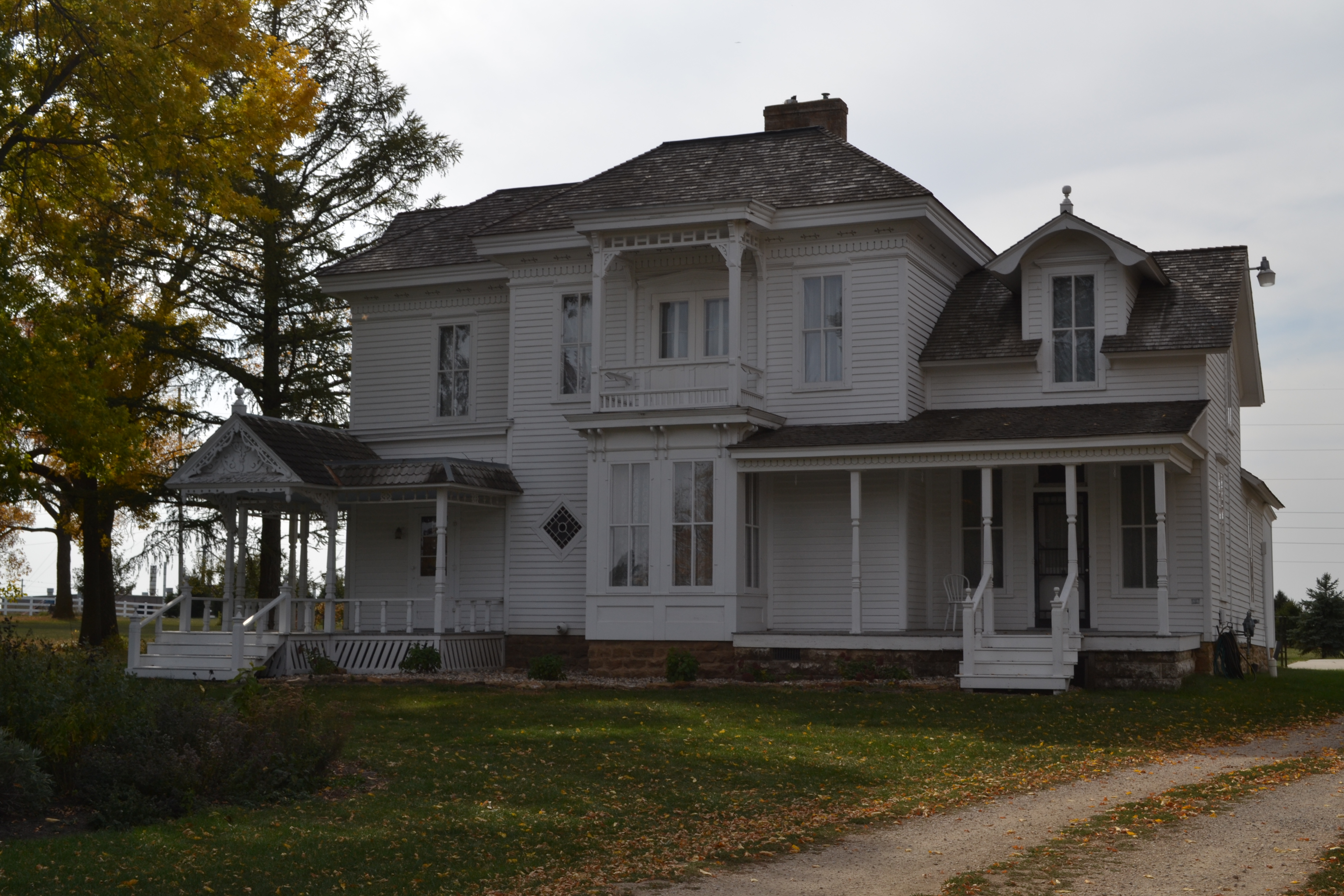

- Location within Iowa Location within the United States
- Location: 26 10th St., NW. Hampton, Iowa
- Coordinates: 42°44′31″N 93°13′14″W
- Built: 1881
- Architectural style: Italianate
- NRHP reference No.: 87000011
- Added to NRHP: February 5, 1987

The Dr. O.B. Harriman House, also known as the Harriman Nielsen Historic Farm, is an historic structure located in Hampton, Iowa, United States. The Italianate style house was built in 1881. It was donated to the Franklin County Historical Society by the Nielsen Estate. It is currently being restored. The house has been listed on the National Register of Historic Places since 1987.
