= Polhemus Memorial Clinic =

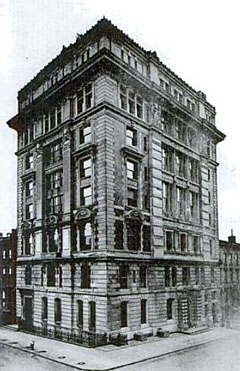
- Polhemus Memorial Clinic, shortly after completion

Geography
- Location: Cobble Hill, Brooklyn, New York, United States
- Coordinates: 40.689333°N 73.9970485°W

History
- Constructed: 1897
- Opened: January 5, 1898
- Closed: July 2008

Links
- Website: https://polhemusresidences.com/
- Lists: Hospitals in New York State

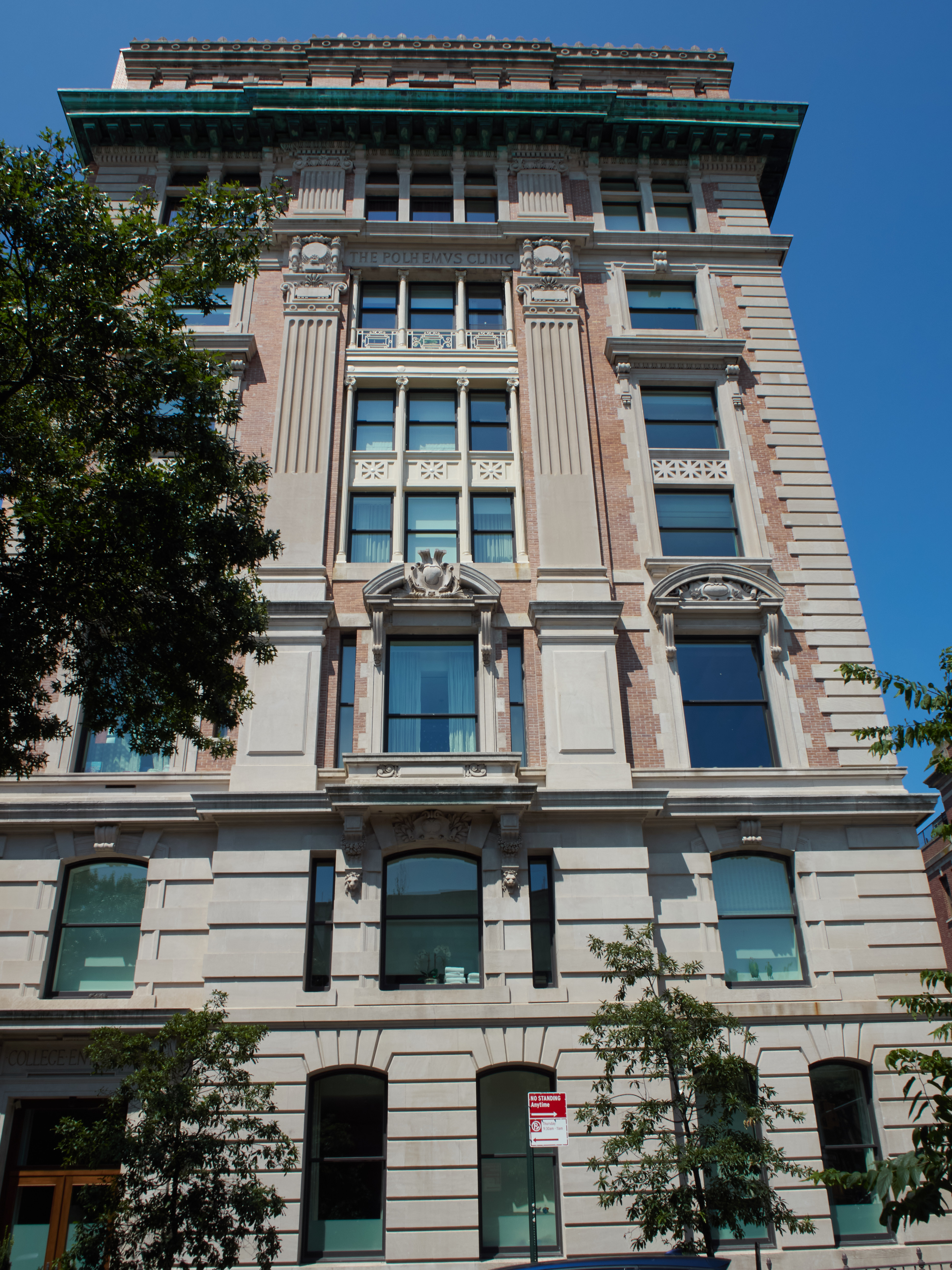
The Polhemus Memorial Clinic converted into Polhemus Residences in 2025

The Polhemus Memorial Clinic in Cobble Hill, Brooklyn, New York City was built in 1897 as an extension of a hospital for the poor on the corner of Henry and Amity streets. It was officially inaugurated January 5, 1898. Throughout most of its lifetime, 1897 to July 2008, it was part of the Long Island College Hospital (LICH). Joseph Korom, the author of The American Skyscraper (2008), considers the eight-story tower to be the first skyscraper hospital ever built. The clinic and adjacent row houses were designated part of the Cobble Hill Historic District in 1988.

== History ==
The Cobble Hill area of Brooklyn was settled by Europeans early in the seventeenth century and was included into the newly incorporated City of Brooklyn in 1834. Present-day street grid was designed in the same 1834 and by 1860 the former farmland was developed into a densely populated row house neighborhood with banks, churches and retail stores. Two row houses on the corner of Henry and Amity, later demolished to make way for the clinic, were built in 1853 by an Irish-American real estate developer Edward Wilson.

Construction of the building was financed by Caroline Herriman Polhemus (died 1906), the sister of William H. Herriman, who provided $400,000 to the Long Island College Hospital (LICH) in the memory of her husband Henry Ditmas Polhemus, who served as the Regent of LICH from 1872 until his death in 1895. Caroline Polhemus also donated a farm in Rockland County to the Brooklyn Children's Aid Society. In the summer of 1895 Caroline Polhemus purchased two corner row houses and demolished them. An architectural contest to design the clinic attracted six bids; a young architect, Marshall Emery, won first prize of $500. Construction commenced in spring of 1897 and was completed in December 1897. Emery described his building, finished in French Renaissance motives, as "dignified and pleasing, at the same time having as strongly a marked, monumental and academic character as the peculiar arrangement of the interior will permit, while refraining from undue or lavish use of ornamentation". Emery consulted with physicians and surgeons to design a thoroughly modern hospital. Separate entrances on each facade separated the students from hospital patients and staff.

The building functions were separated vertically; originally, Pohlemus Clinic housed:

- the hospital's dispensary in the first two floors;
- administration and student locker rooms in the third floor;
- training classes in the fourth to seventh floors;
- and dissecting rooms of the Department of Anatomy in the eighth floor.

The clinic was equipped with an elevator, steam heating, forced ventilation, electrical generators and one of the first x-ray machines in existence. After the United States entry into World War I, Polhemus Clinic provided x-ray facilities to the United States Marines.

In July 2008 LICH closed and sold the Polhemus Building (then housing its departments of surgery and anaesthesia) and the maternity ward, citing the need to raise cash to escape bankruptcy. Doctors split over the decision, blaming Continuum Health Partners for the mismanagement of Brooklyn hospitals.

Fortis Property Group bought the Polhemus Building in 2008, and it sat vacant until 2016, when plans to restore and repurpose it came into effect. The building reopened as condominiums in 2020.

== See also ==
- Long Island College Hospital
- Cobble Hill, Brooklyn
