= Harriman State Park =

Harriman State Park may refer to:

- Harriman State Park (Idaho)
- Harriman State Park (New York)
