= University Hospital of Brooklyn at Long Island College Hospital =

Former hospital in Brooklyn, New York

Coordinates: 40°41′23″N 73°59′48.3″W

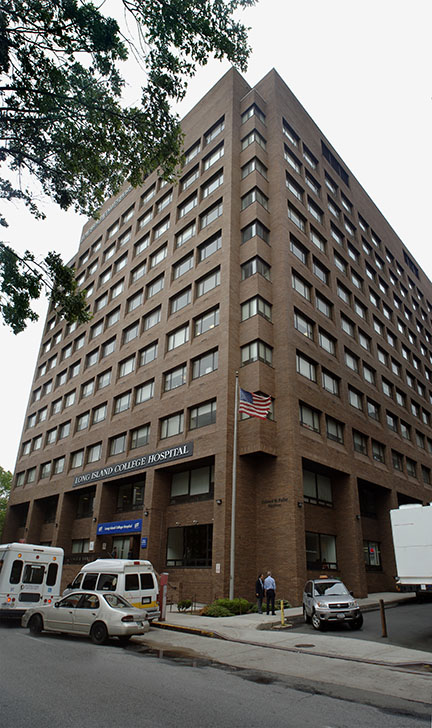
- Long Island College Hospital, 2010

Geography
- Location: Brooklyn, Brooklyn Heights and Cobble Hill neighborhoods, New York, United States

Services
- Beds: 508

History
- Opened: 1858
- Closed: August 30, 2014

Links
- Lists: Hospitals in New York State

University Hospital of Brooklyn at Long Island College Hospital (or LICH) was a 506-bed teaching hospital located in the Brooklyn Heights and Cobble Hill neighborhoods of Brooklyn, New York. The hospital was founded in 1858 as Long Island College Hospital and following years-long attempts to save it through mergers and property development, it ceased operations on August 30, 2014.

== History ==
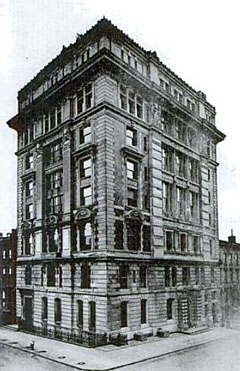
Polhemus Memorial Clinic c. 1897

Long Island College Hospital introduced the practice of bedside teaching in 1860, and it later became the first U.S. hospital to use stethoscopes and anesthesia. In 1873 it introduced the first emergency ambulance service in Brooklyn. Its collegiate division would later form the Downstate Medical Center, an academic unit of the State University of New York in 1948.

The Polhemus Memorial Clinic, an eight-story 1897 tower that was part of LICH until July 2008, is considered to be the first example of a skyscraper hospital, anywhere in the world.

== Merger and closure ==
The facility had years-long financial issues, and had it been privately-run, it would have been able to file bankruptcy. That was not an option as it was a public hospital. By 2008, the hospital was affiliated with the Continuum Health Partners and had been in financial trouble due, in part, to capital debt. On May 27, 2011, Long Island College Hospital became part of SUNY Downstate's University Hospital of Brooklyn, renamed as University Hospital of Brooklyn at Long Island College Hospital, serving as a clinical campus for medical students in the Downstate College of Medicine. This merger made sense, in part, due to the existing partnership with SUNY Downstate that dated back fifty years. The state helped facilitate the merger to help avoid the closures that were facing other New York City hospitals.

=== Closure ===
On February 8, 2013, the Trustees of the State University of New York voted to close the hospital, which met with immediate protest from the public and the unions. A re-vote by the State University of New York board of trustees was taken on March 19, 2013, who again voted to close down the hospital. On April 1, 2013, for a second time the closing of the hospital was stalled in court and patient census fell to 18 from 375.

It was losing $15 million per month as of July 2013. As a way of maintaining the hospital, SUNY issued an RFP on July 17, 2013 to seek bids from developers who could turn the property into a profitable venture through mixed use real estate projects while maintaining medical services for the community. Three days prior to the bids being due, a NY State judge invalidated the effort to sell the property. On July 19, 2013, the New York State Department of Health approved SUNY Downstate Medical Center's plan to close the hospital, which called for all remaining patients to be transferred or discharged on or before July 28. The plan also called for the hospital to stop admitting patients from its emergency department on July 22, and for the hospital's elective surgery schedule to be canceled, effective the same day. According to the plan, LICH continued to operate its emergency department until July 29. A state supreme court justice upheld a temporary restraining order preventing SUNY Downstate from shutting it down, and ordered both sides back to court on July 31 to decide its future.

On August 20, 2013, Brooklyn Supreme Court Justice Carolyn Demarest ordered the closure of the hospital to be stalled, citing a breach in the agreement by SUNY Downstate, concluding that SUNY "didn't buy the 18-building complex in the heart of downtown Brooklyn in good faith.". Among those involved with the protests against the facility's closure were then public advocate and future mayor, Bill de Blasio. His subsequent role in the property's sale came under further criticism.

While protests and lawsuits continued following the facility's closure in August 2014, NYU operated a walk in emergency room by October of that same year.

=== Sale and development plans ===
Once the lawsuits were settled and the hospital closed, bidding ensued, Louis Kestenbaum's Fortis Property Group won the bid. The initial Fortis proposal offered SUNY about half of the estimated $500 million value—for the 200,000-square-foot complex, of which 15,000 square feet would be made into a facility with an urgent care center, physical therapy center, dental and other surgery space, but no emergency room and no full-use hospital. At the time, mayoral candidate Bill de Blasio opposed the Fortis plan because it did not contain a full hospital and had too much luxury housing compared to what the neighborhood could accommodate. Community organizations and SUNY decided to withdraw the bids and reopen the process to capture bids that would give the "community what it wanted". As a result, Brooklyn Hospital made a bid for the property that included 1,000 housing units, 1/3 of them to be "affordable", an outpatient medical facility and a 24-hour emergency services department.

In January 2014, SUNY called for revamped bids to reflect the wants of the community and expectations of SUNY. The winning bidder of the 2014 bidding process was Brooklyn Health Partners, which said it would operate a 300- to 400-bed hospital on the site. One of BHP's former partners claimed that BHP miscalculated "the cost of renovations needed at the site, in order to accommodate a facility with up to 400 beds." On May 5, SUNY issued a notice stating that Brooklyn Health Partners failed to complete the terms of the agreement and had decided to move on to the next highest bidder. BHP suggested that it would sue SUNY to prevent it from negotiating with the runner-up. The following day, SUNY began negotiating with The Peebles Corporation. BHP had gone to court to stop that process and asked the judge, New York State Supreme Court justice Johnny Lee Baynes, to give them more time. Then, another lawsuit was filed by Brooklyn-based six community groups, represented by activist lawyer Jim Walden of Gibson Dunn & Crutcher; Walden asked Baynes to disallow the scores given by six individuals on the LICH scoring committee. On May 15, Justice Baynes returned a ruling declaring that SUNY negotiate with the four bidders, but that his ruling does not impact SUNY's ability to continue finalizing the agreement with Peebles's team, to which the New York Post called the actions of the judge, "lunacy".

=== New development ===
A new development of seven towers was revealed in 2015. The development was to be constructed by Fortis Property Group and known as River Park. It was initially controversial because its high-rise design would have clashed with the mostly low-rise nature of the surrounding neighborhood, and residents were concerned that there would not be sufficient replacement medical facilities. Construction started in 2017 with expected completion set for 2023. In 2018, renderings of the towers were released. The tallest tower, the 475-foot 2 River Park, would be one of the tallest buildings in Brooklyn when finished. In March 2020, the property was sold to NYU Langone and as of July 2021, the property was slated to be an ambulatory care facility.
