= Dead Poet Carried by a Centaur =

Watercolour by Gustave Moreau

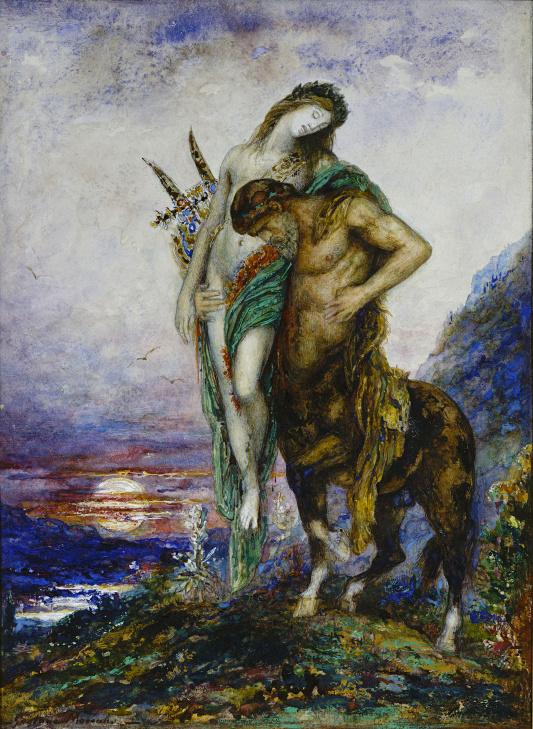
- Artist: Gustave Moreau
- Year: c. 1890
- Type: watercolour
- Dimensions: 33.5 cm × 24.5 cm (13.2 in × 9.6 in)
- Location: Musée National Gustave-Moreau; Paris

Dead Poet Carried by a Centaur is a c. 1890 watercolour by Gustave Moreau, produced shortly after the death of his companion Alexandrine Dureux and representing a reflection on the duality of man and the fate reserved for artists. It is now in the Musée national Gustave Moreau, in Paris.

== History ==
This watercolor is generally dated to around 1890. It was produced shortly after the death of Alexandrine Dureux. André Breton, who was an admirer of Gustave Moreau, owned a copy of this work with the title Centaur and Nymph.

== Interpretation ==
Moreau represents here one of his favorite subjects, the poet. But this poet is anonymous, he is no longer the Orpheus of his painting of 1865 or even Sappho. It is in fact a reflection on the duality of human nature, with the poet symbolizing the spiritual part and the centaur the material part. It is also a pessimistic reflection on the fate reserved for artists; thus, as Ary Renan:

How many perished without funeral at the bottom of the solitary ravines. Certainly, it happens that a charitable centaur takes in the victim and thinks, in his simple heart, that the man was insane; but oblivion, like still water, buries most of them.

Nature is empathetic here since the sun sets at the same time as the poet dies.

== Bibliography ==
- Lacambre, Geneviève; Druick, Douglas W.; Feinberg, Larry J.; Stein, Susan (1998). Gustave Moreau 1826-1898 (in French). Tours: Réunion des musées nationaux. GM18261898.
- Lacambre, Geneviève (1997). "Maître Sorcier". Gustave Moreau (in French). Paris: Gallimard et Réunion des musées nationaux. ISBN 2-07-053388-3. GMsorcier.
- Mathieu, Pierre-Louis (1998). "L'assembleur de rêves". Gustave Moreau (in French). Courbevoie: ACR Édition. ISBN 2-86770-115-5. GMreves.
- Јована М. Николић (Jovana M. Nikolić). "Концепт мртвог песника у симболизму слика Уморни кентаур Гистава Мороа из Народног Музеја у Београду". Зборник Народног Музеја – Београд (in Serbian). Belgrade.
- Renan, Ary (1900). Gustave Moreau (in French). Paris: Gazette des beaux-arts.
- Catalogue sommaire des peintures, dessins, cartons et aquarelles exposés dans les galeries du Musée Gustave Moreau. 1926. p. 74.
