= The Mystic Flower =

Painting by Gustave Moureau

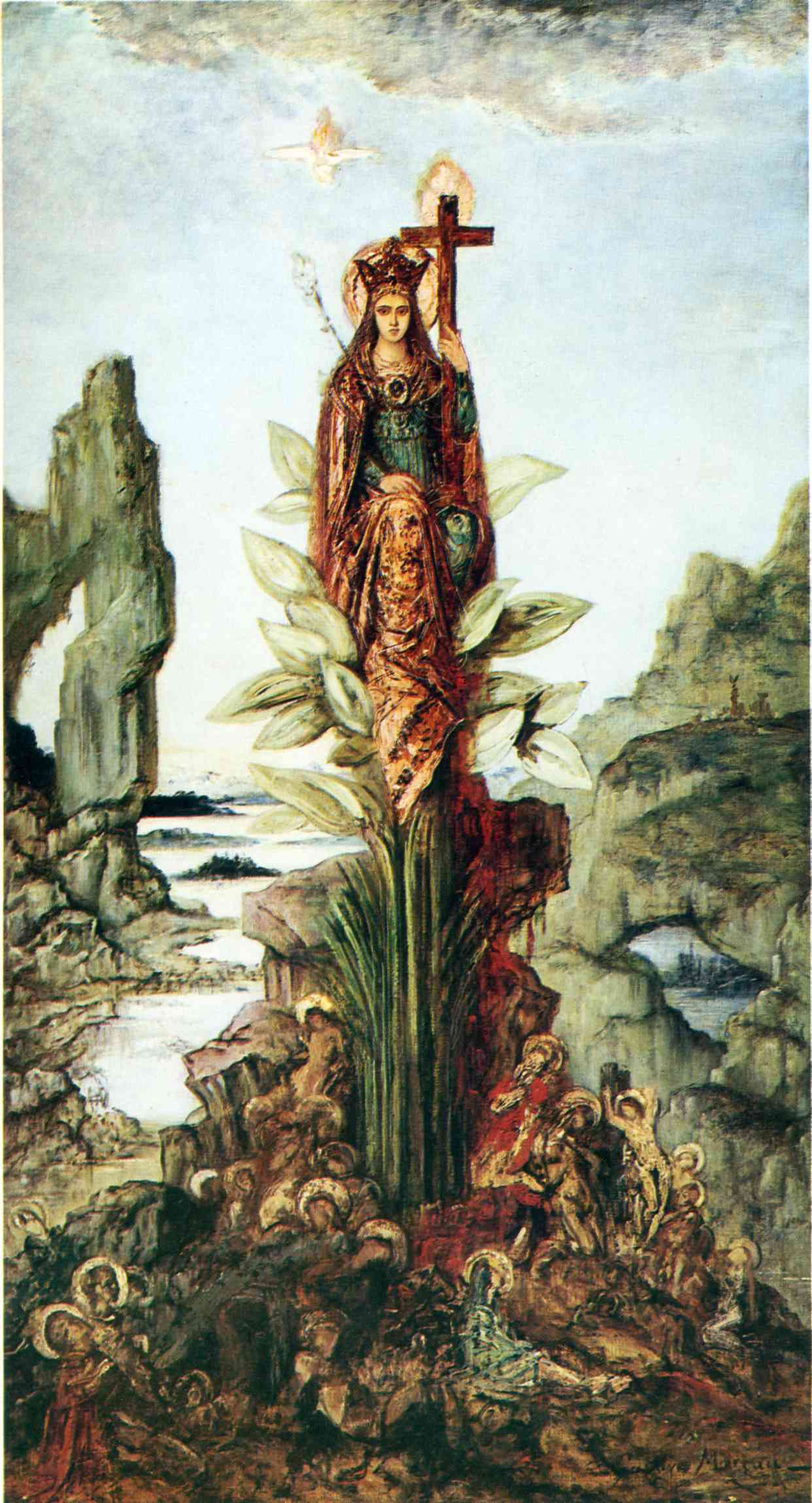
- Artist: Gustave Moreau
- Year: c. 1890
- Type: oil on canvas
- Dimensions: 253 cm × 137 cm (100 in × 54 in)
- Location: Musée National Gustave-Moreau, Paris

The Mystic Flower is an oil-on-canvas painting by the French Symbolist painter Gustave Moreau, created c. 1890. A religious work, it was inspired by Carpaccio's Apotheosis of Saint Ursula, which Moreau was able to copy during his stay in Venice. At 2.53 metres tall, this original work closed Moreau's Cycle of Man by showing the importance of sacrifice by heroic figures.

== History ==
Moreau painted the work at the end of his life, when he was reflecting on his works' future. He thus began editing the accounts of his works and creating canvases on a museum format such as The Mystic Flower. It was also an era when Moreau produced more and more vertically symmetrical compositions such as Christ The Redeemer.

The canvas was painted after the death of his mother and his companion Alexandrine Dureux. After their deaths the subjects in his paintings became more meditative and melancholic, with a certain interest in religiosity. Although Moreau had been raised by agnostic parents and was not religiously practising, he developed very personal religious beliefs. So he explained: “Do you believe in God? I only believe in him. I don't believe in what I touch or what I see. I only believe in what I don't see and only in what I feel. My brain, my reason seem ephemeral and of dubious reality to me; only my inner feeling seems to me eternal, incontestably certain”.

== Description ==
This canvas of a large format reveals a vast rocky landscape. At its base, a mound is covered with small figures of martyrs, shrouded in the pain of their torture. From this mound springs an immense lily at the top of which sits a representation of the Church with entirely Byzantine hieraticism, which can be assimilated to the Virgin Mary, holding a cross which the celestial bird comes to visit. The assimilation of this female figure to the Virgin Mary is given by Moreau itself in his writings: “The corolla of a large lily serves as a throne for a figure of the Holy Virgin”. This ensemble forms a pyramidal composition with the mound as its base and this gigantic Virgin as its summit.

== Interpretation ==
To interpret this work, the format is important. Indeed, its from a period when Moreau created large canvases; but the very proportions of his paintings were not chosen randomly. For example, he chose square formats to express a certain fullness in works like The Triumph of Alexander the Great. When he chooses this vertically stretched format, it is to express a relationship of domination. He explains: “All the martyrs who died for Her have watered this mystical flower, symbol of purity, with their blood”. This domination is therefore that of the Church over the martyrs. Moreau was very impregnated by the religion of his time which exalted restorative suffering and the cult of the Virgin; this suffering echoes that of the artist in his final years. This conception of redemptive sacrifice is similar to that which Moreau had of heroes. Indeed, the heroes he represents, such as Oedipus, Jason, Theseus, Hercules, Moses, Prometheus, Jesus, Saint John the Baptist and Saint Martin are all in his work dedicated to sacrifice. They are civilizing heroes representing the triumph of spirit over matter but ultimately, they have to die. It is therefore with this work, The Mystical Flower, that the Cycle of Man described by Léonce Bénédite, is completed.

Concerning this figure of the Virgin, it belongs to a very particular historical and iconographic context. It is customary to represent the Virgin as a true giant, in the case of the Virgin of Mercy, whose disproportion allows her to protect all humanity with her large mantle. Nevertheless, in the second half of the 19th century this gigantism was no longer synonymous with protection but with fear. Three features emerge from this new iconography: firstly there is the domination of the female figure by its place within a pyramidal composition, then by its disproportion in relation to the other characters, and finally by the plurality of male figures facing a unique female figure. The Mystical Flower shares these three characteristics: the female figure is at the top of a pyramidal structure, disproportionately large and alone facing the multitude; consequently, she is no longer a protective Virgin. Rather than protecting the martyrs, she sits above them and it is from their sacrificial blood that the flower that bears it springs.

== Influences ==
This composition was inspired by Vittore Carpaccio's Glory of St. Ursula, which Moreau had the opportunity to copy during his stay in Venice in the fall of 1858, while he was studying the work of this painter in depth. He takes the idea of the saint placed at the top of a sheaf of palm leaves for his own canvas. As for the rocky landscape, it is inspired by Leonardo da Vinci, whose work Moreau had studied at length, notably the Virgin of the Rocks.

== Bibliography ==
- Léonce Bénédite (1998) [1899]. L'idéalisme en France et en Angleterre: Gustave Moreau & E. Burne-Jones (in French). La Rochelle: Rumeur des Âges. ISBN 2-84327-023-5.
- Dottin-Orsini, Mireille (1999). "Portrait de femme : Gustave Moreau et Gustav-Adolf Mossa". In Bard, Christine (ed.). Un siècle d'antiféminisme (in French). Paris: Fayard. ISBN 2-213-60285-9.
- Dottin-Orsini, Mireille (2004). "Femmes peintes, femmes (d)écrites : le cas Gustave Moreau". In Mansau, Andrée (ed.). Des femmes : images et écritures (in French). Toulouse: Presses universitaires du Mirail. ISBN 2-85816-697-8.
- Geneviève Lacambre (1990). Peintures, cartons, aquarelles, etc. exposés dans les galeries du Musée Gustave Moreau (in French). Paris: Réunion des musées nationaux. ISBN 2-7118-2371-7.
- Geneviève Lacambre (1997). Gustave Moreau: Maître Sorcier (in French). Paris: Gallimard et Réunion des musées nationaux. ISBN 2-07-053388-3.
- Lacambre, Geneviève; Druick, Douglas W.; Feinberg, Larry J.; Stein, Susan (1998). Gustave Moreau 1826-1898 (in French). Tours: Réunion des musées nationaux. ISBN 2-7118-3577-4.
- Mathieu, Pierre-Louis (1994). Gustave Moreau (in French). Paris: Flammarion. ISBN 2-08-011743-2.
- Mathieu, Pierre-Louis; Lacambre, Geneviève (1997). Le Musée Gustave Moreau (in French). Paris: Réunion des musées nationaux. ISBN 2-7118-3479-4.
- Mathieu, Pierre-Louis (1998). Gustave Moreau: L'assembleur de rêves (in French). Courbevoie: ACR Édition. ISBN 2-86770-115-5.
- Catalogue sommaire des peintures, dessins, cartons et aquarelles exposés dans les galeries du Musée Gustave Moreau. 1926. p. 11.
