= Chimères =

Chimères, French for chimeras, may refer to:

- The Chimeras, an 1853 sequence of sonnets by Gérard de Nerval
- Les Chimères (painting), an 1884 painting by Gustave Moreau
- Chimères (film), a 2013 film directed by Olivier Beguin
- Chimères (pour Ondes Martenot), a 2020 album by Christine Ott

== See also ==
- Chimera (disambiguation)
