= Lucien Lévy-Dhurmer =

French painter

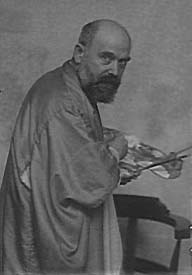
Lucien Lévy-Dhurmer.

Lucien Lévy-Dhurmer (30 September 1865 – 24 September 1953) was a French artist and a leading exponent of fin-de-siècle Symbolism and Art Nouveau. His works include paintings, drawings, ceramics, furniture and interior design.

== Early life ==
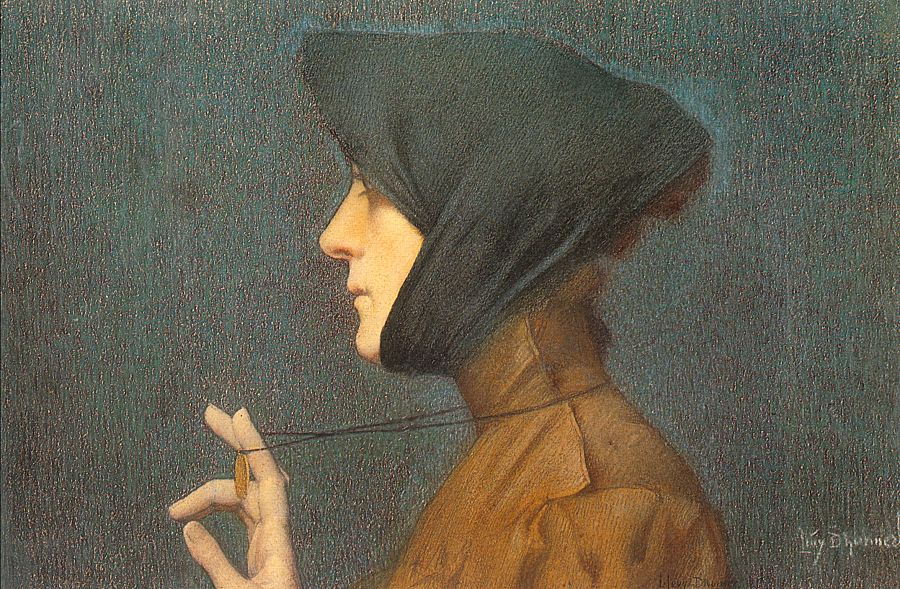
La Femme à la Médaille ou Mystère (1896). Musée d'Orsay, Paris

Born Lucien Lévy to a Jewish family in Algiers, French Algeria in 1865, he began studying drawing and sculpture in Paris at the Ecole Supérieure de Dessin et de Sculpture in 1879. He first exhibited at the Paris Salon of 1882 where he showed a small ceramic plaque. In 1887 Lévy began making his living near Cannes in southern France, overseeing the decoration of ceramics. From 1886 to 1895 he worked as a ceramic decorator and then as artistic director of the studio of Clément Massier. Around 1892 he signed his first pieces of ceramics, which were influenced by Islamic Art. In 1895 he left for Paris to begin a career in painting; around this time he visited Italy and was further influenced by art of the Renaissance.

== Career ==
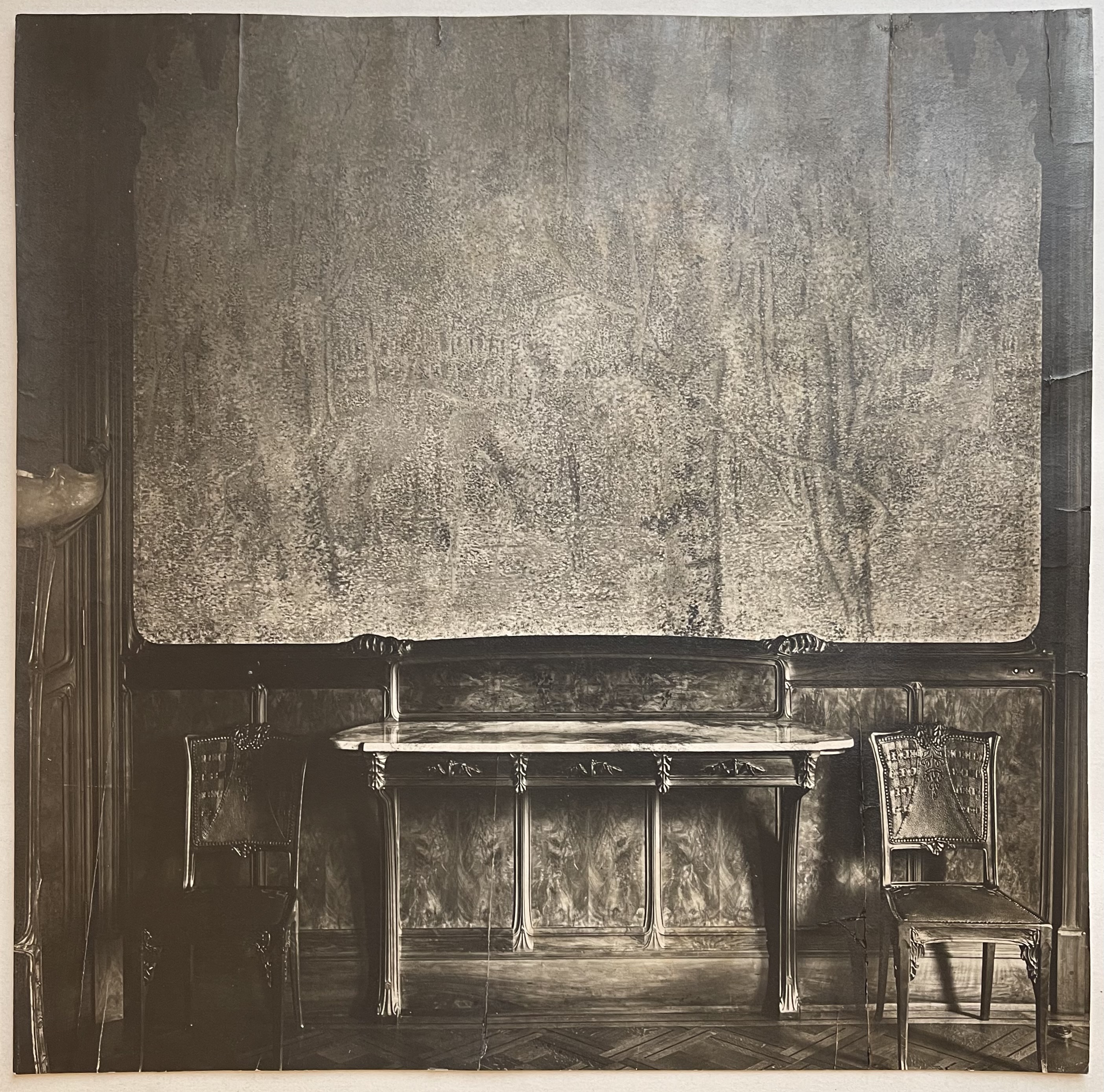
Levy-Durmer Wisteria Dining Room in Paris, 1914, vintage silver print

In 1896 he exhibited his first pastels and paintings under the name Lucien Lévy-Dhurmer; he had added the last two syllables of his mother's maiden name (Goldhurmer), likely to differentiate himself from other people named Lévy. His paintings soon became popular with the public and among fellow artists as well. He earned high praise for the academic attention to detail with which he captured figures lost in a Pre-Raphaelite haze of melancholy, contrasted with bright Impressionist colouration. His portrait of writer Georges Rodenbach is perhaps the most striking example of this synergy.

After 1901 Lévy-Dhurmer moved away from expressly Symbolist content, incorporating more landscapes into his work because of his travels in Europe and North Africa. He continued to draw inspiration from music and attempted to capture works of great composers such as Beethoven in painted form.

== Personal life ==
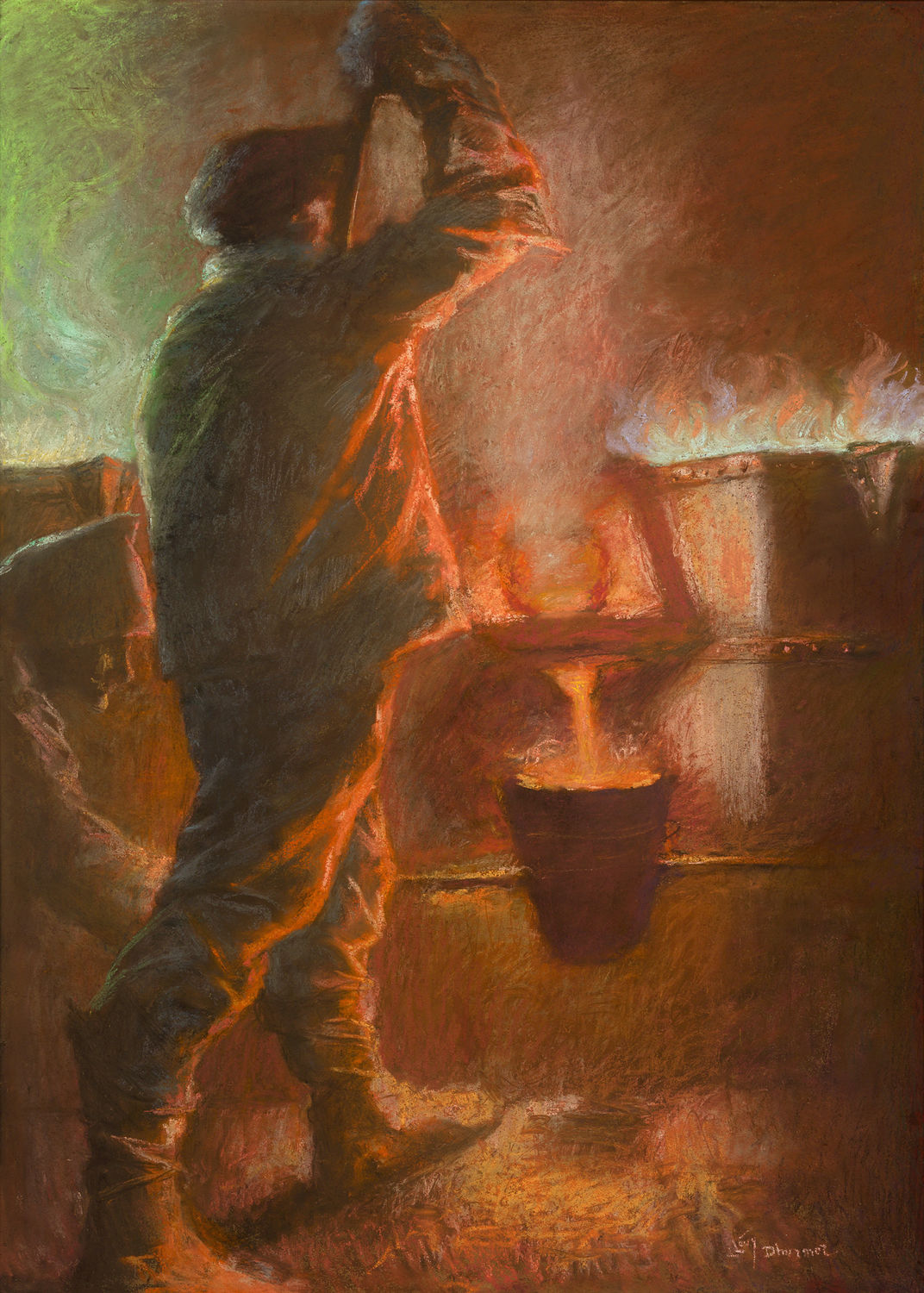
Le fondeur de bronze by Lucien Lévy-Dhurmer. Circa 1906-1907. Pastel on paper.

In 1914 Lévy-Dhurmer married Emmy Fournier, who had been an editor of the early feminist newspaper La Fronde. By this time he was working primarily on landscapes, both oil and pastel, in a style similar to Whistler and Monet.

== Death ==
Lévy-Dhurmer died in Le Vésinet in 1953.

== Works ==
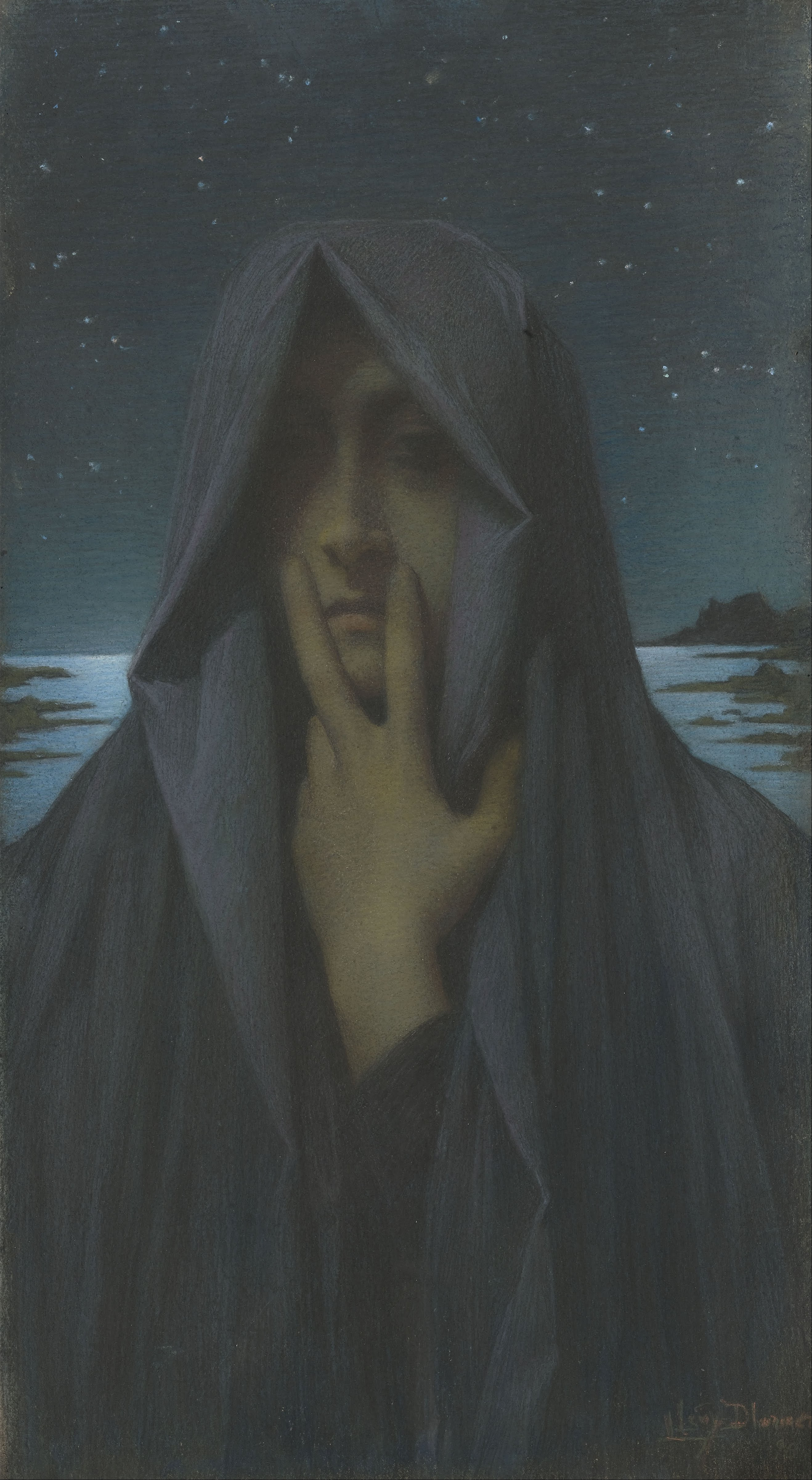
Le Silence, 1895

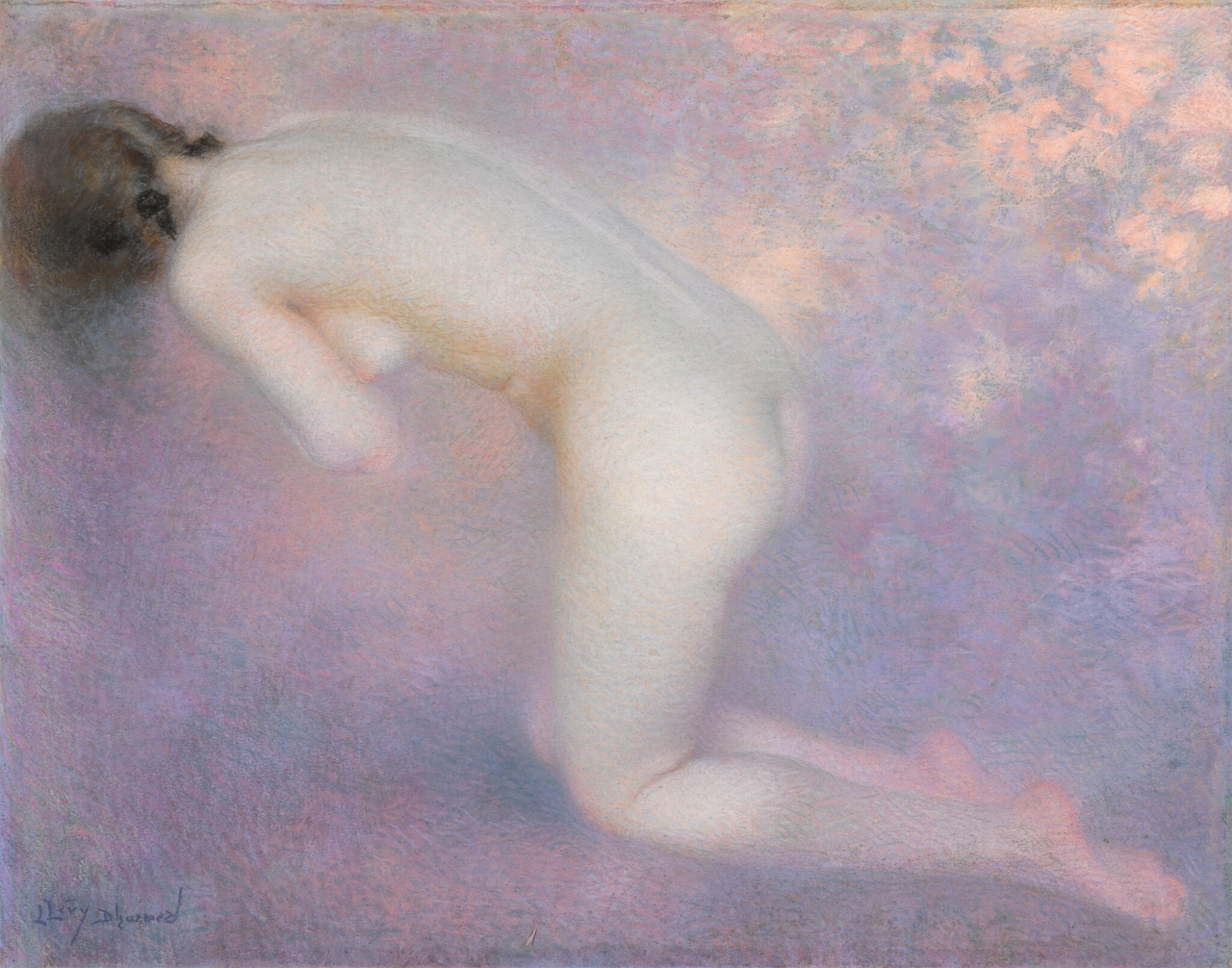
Ariette

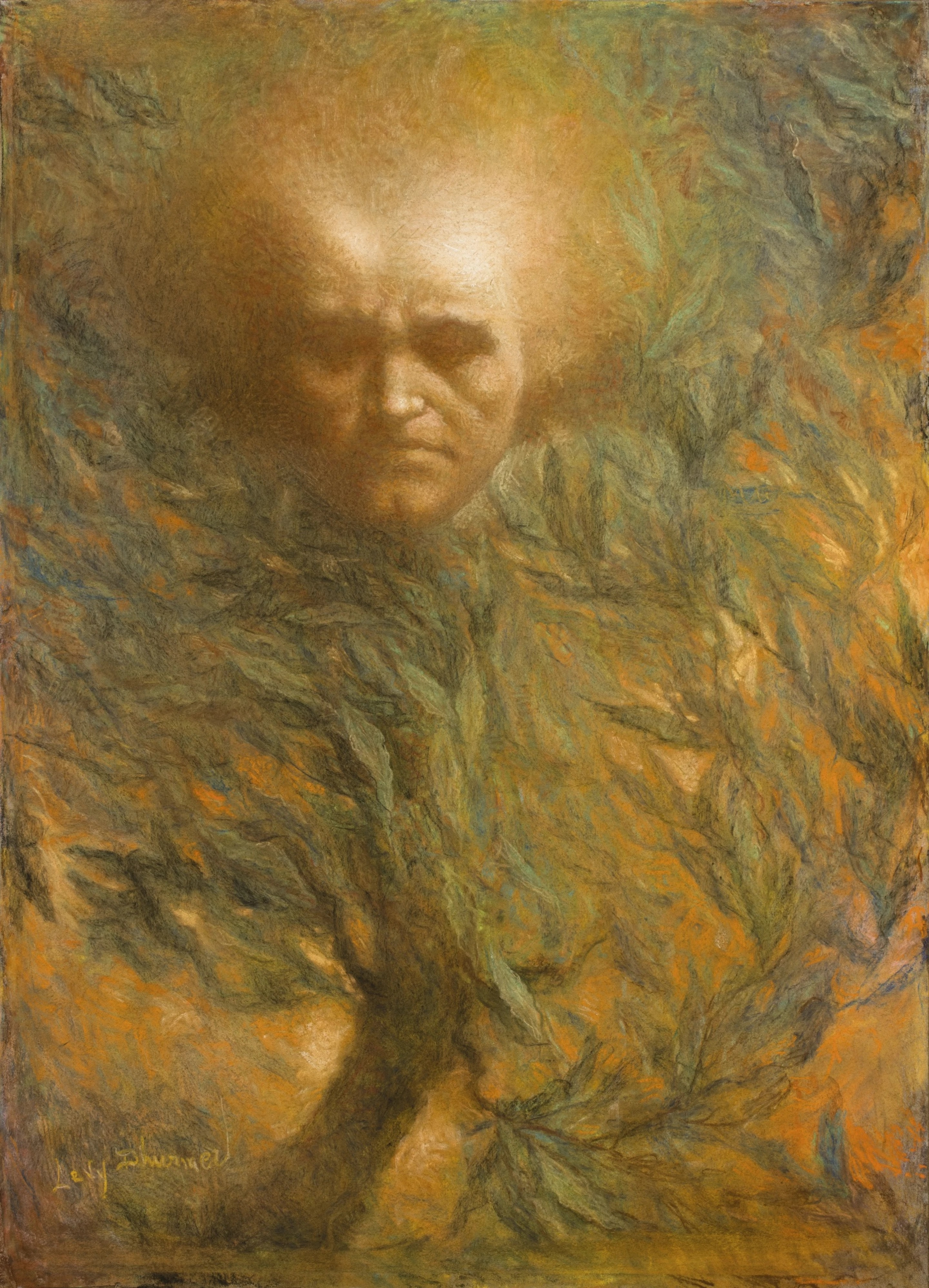
Beethoven's Mask, 1906

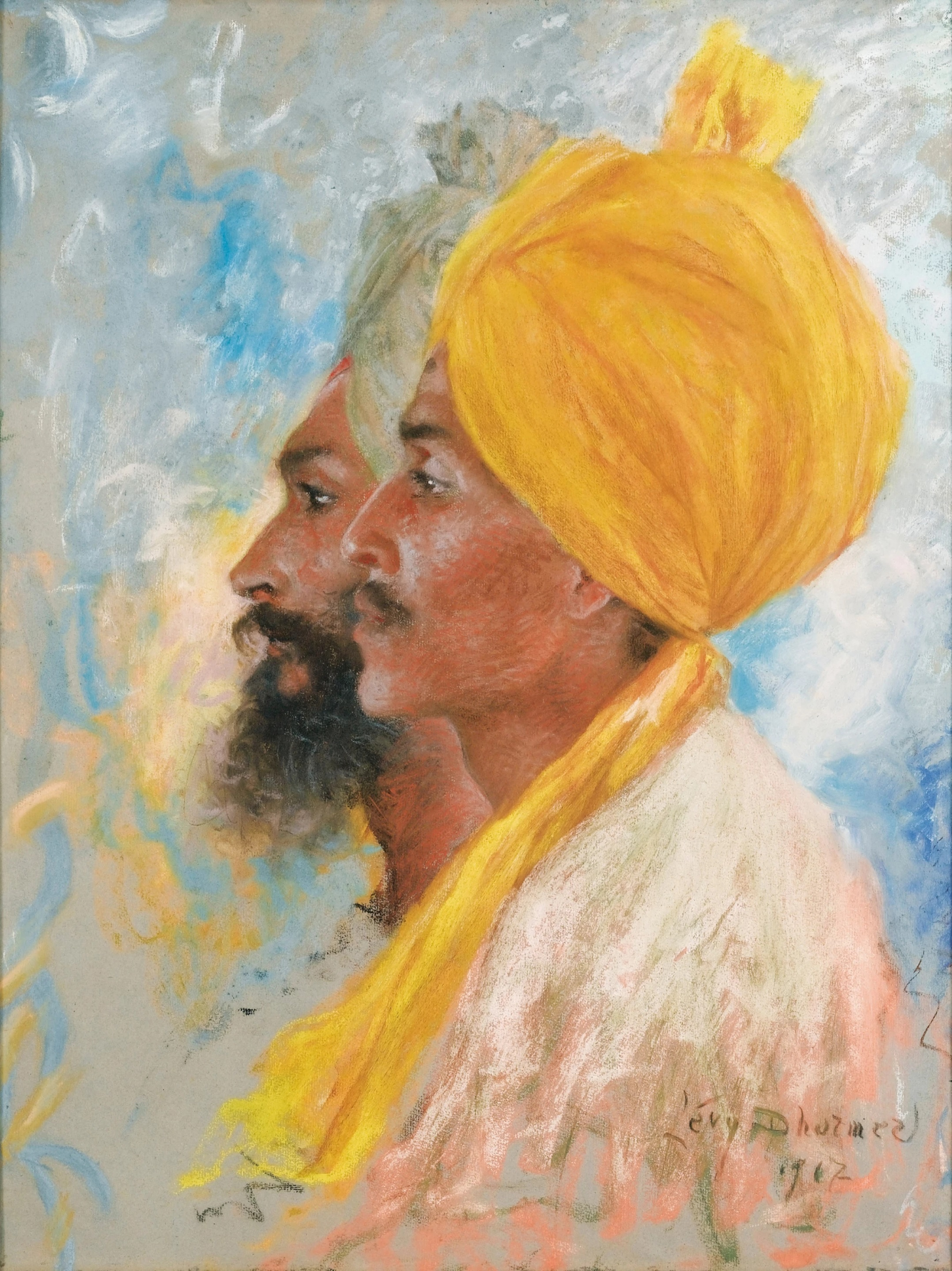
Deus sikhs ("Two Sikhs"), 1917

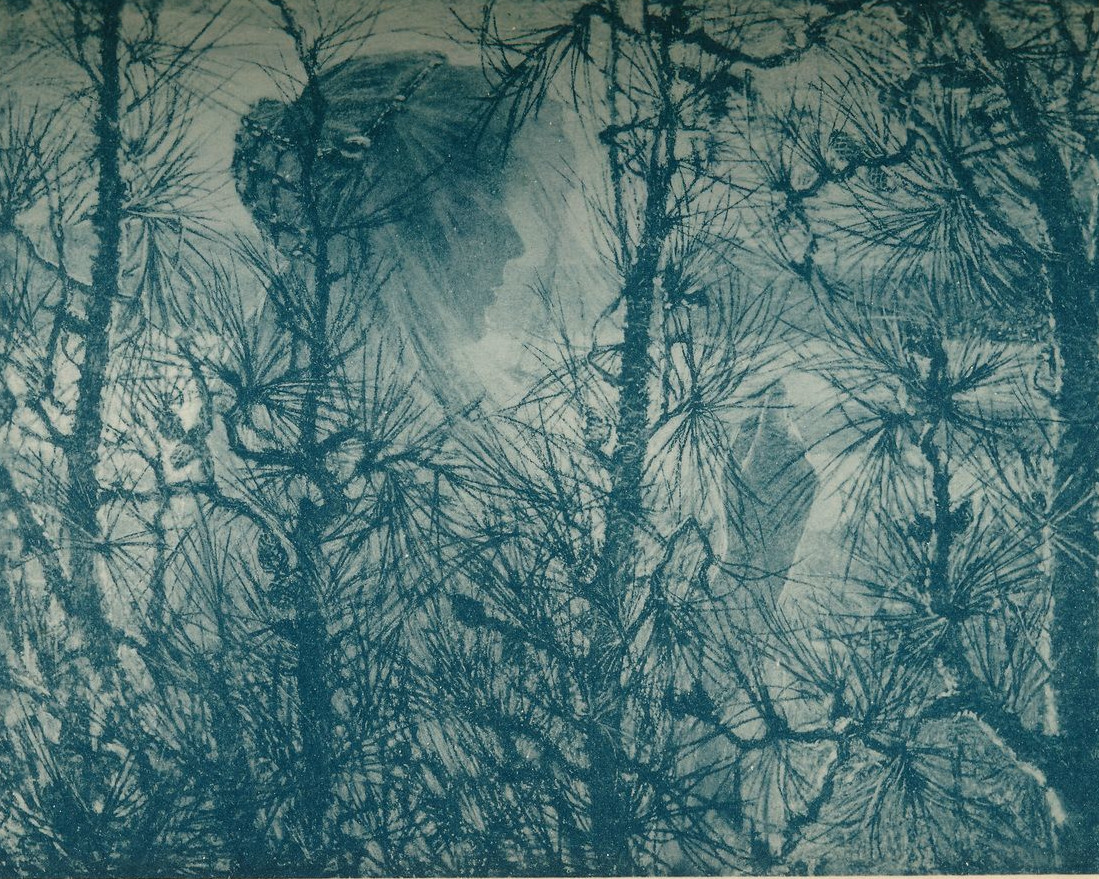
Les Kitharèdes, 1904

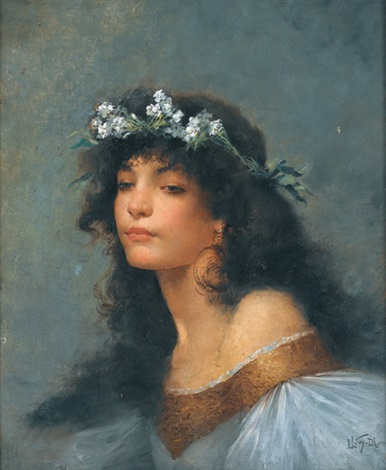
Young Woman with Wreath of Flowers in Hair, 1896

- La Sorcière, 1897, pastel on paper, 61 x 46 cm, Paris : Musée d’Orsay.
- Le Silence, 1895, pastel, 54 x 29 cm, Paris : Musée d'Orsay.
- Les aveugles à Tanger, 1901, pastel on paper, 50 x 70 cm, Paris : Musée d’Orsay.
- L’explorateur perdu, 1896, pastel on paper, 59 x 38 cm, Paris : Musée d’Orsay.
- Méduse, 1897, Pastel and charcoal on paper, 59 x 40 cm, Paris : Musée d’Orsay.
- Portrait de Georges Rodenbach, ca. 1895, pastel on paper, 36 x 55 cm, signed : "L. Lévy-Dhurmer", Paris : Musée d'Orsay.
- Portrait de Pierre Loti or Fantôme d'Orient, 1896, pastel, 42,5 x 56,5 cm, Bayonne : Musée basque.
- Feux d'artifice à Venise, s.d., pastel, 87,5 x 53,8 cm, Paris : Musée du Petit Palais
- Torse de femme vue de face, s.d., pastel, 80 x 55 cm, Paris : Musée du Petit Palais.
- Torse de femme vue de dos, s.d., pastel, 80 x 43,5 cm, Paris : Musée du Petit Palais.
- Le Marocain ou Le Fanatique, ca. 1900, oil on canvas, 64,5 x 50 cm, Paris : musée du Quai Branly,
- Notre Dame de Penmarc'h, 1896, oil on canvas, 41 x 33 cm, signed and dated : "L. Lévy-Dhurmer / 1896", Musée des Beaux-Arts de Quimper.
- Eve, 1896, pastel and gouache, 49 x 46 cm, private collection.
- Bourrasque, ca. 1896, pastel on paper, 40 x 48 cm, Paris : private collection.
- La mort d'Atala, 1801, porcelain painting, 41 x 60 cm, Maison de Chateaubriand
- Alfred-Philippe Roll (1847-1919), 1913, pastel on paper, 153,4 x 95 cm (1913), Musée de l’Histoire de France (Versailles)
- Les Mères pendant la guerre : douze compositions inédites, Paris : Devambez, 1917, Paris : Musée d’histoire contemporaine.

Music :

- Les roses d'Ispahan, from a melody of Fauré, pastel, private collection.
- L'après-midi d'un faune, pastel, Paris, private collection.
- Triptych, ca. 1906, pastel and pencil, Paris : Musée du Petit Palais : Hymne à la joie, 48 x 63 cm, Beethoven, 63 x 48 cm, L'Appassionata 48 x 63 cm.

French Art Nouveau interior :

Lucien Lévy-Dhurmer realised the architectural setting of the house of Auguste Rateau (1863–1930) between 1910 and 1914. The entire room Wisteria Dining room is now conserved at the Metropolitan Museum.

== Sources ==
=== Primary sources ===
- Archives of the Family Zagorowsky at la Documentation du Musée d'Orsay.
- Polak, Félix (1896). « Exposition Lévy-Dhurmer », in Art et Chiffons, n°6, 9 février.
- Sorrèze, Jacques (1900). « Artistes contemporains L. Lévy-Dhurmer », in Revue de l'art Ancien et Moderne, 10 avril.
- Thévenin, Léon (1898). La Renaissance Paienne. Paris : L. Vanier.

=== Secondary sources ===
- Barbe, Françoise. Duclos, Clarisse (1982). Le portrait chez Lévy-Dhurmer. Paris : Université Paris-Sorbonne.
- Gibson, Michael (1995). "Symbolism". Köln: Benedikit Taschen Verlag. ISBN 3-8228-9324-2.
- Lacambre, Geneviève (1973). « Lucien Lévy-Dhurmer 1865-1953 », in La Revue du Louvre. Paris, n°1, p. 27-34.
- Peltre, Christine (1997). Les Orientalistes. Paris : Hazan.
- Sage, Deborah (2009–2011), Les voyages de Lucien Lévy-Dhurmer (1865-1953) . Paris : Université Paris Ouest-La Défense.
- Thornton, Lynne (1983). Les Orientalistes, peintres voyageurs : 1828-1908. Paris : ACR.
- Autour de Lévy-Dhurmer, Visionnaires et intimistes en 1900 (1973). Catalogue d’exposition, Galerie du Grand Palais, Paris.
