= Tattooed Salome =

Painting by Gustave Moureau

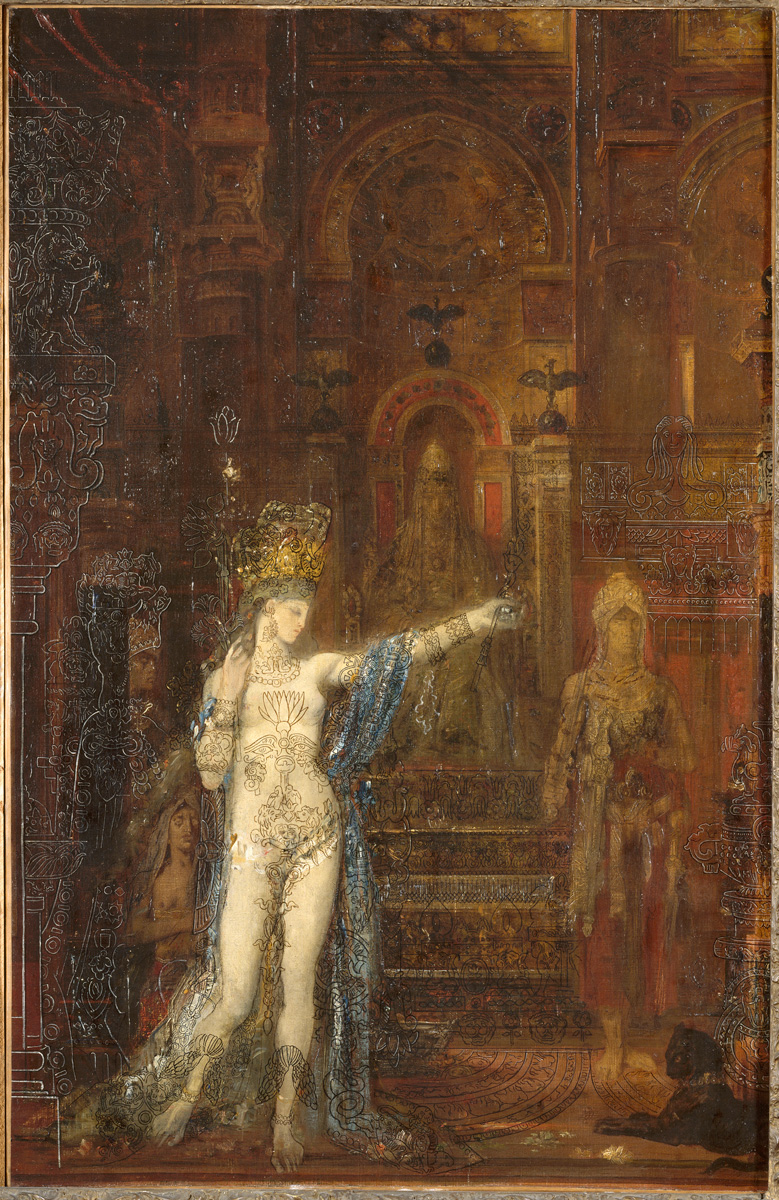
- Artist: Gustave Moreau
- Year: 1874
- Type: oil on canvas
- Dimensions: 92 cm × 60 cm (36 in × 24 in)
- Location: Musée National Gustave-Moreau; Paris

Tattooed Salome or Salome is an oil on canvas painting by Gustave Moreau, begun in 1874 but never completed - for example, the tattoos were added in the painter's last years over the original layer. It is now in the Musée Gustave-Moreau, in Paris.

== History and description ==
This painting was started around 1874 and remained unfinished. There were other paintings about Salome which were presented at the Salon of 1876. The superimposed motifs were added to this canvas in 1890, after the death of Alexandrine Dureux.

Unlike in The Apparition, John the Baptist is absent here; it's Salome who takes the center stage. This painting is in fact a variation of the scene of Salome dancing before Herod. She stands facing her front, naked, slightly swayed, with her face in profile and her left arm raised. Herod is in the background on a throne and with the executioner of Saint John the Baptist nearby. An entire decor is superimposed on the canvas, giving the appearance of a tattoo.

== Interpretation ==
These superimposed patterns are a truly original process which does not find its origin in any academic tradition. This technique allows Moreau to have total freedom in the application of colors, which he develops in large areas before covering them with this ornamental net all in lines. The motifs themselves come from several different sources.

== Bibliography ==
- (in French) Geneviève Lacambre, Douglas W. Druick, Larry J. Feinberg and Susan Stein, Gustave Moreau 1826-1898, Tours, Réunion des musées nationaux, 1998
