= Salome Dancing before Herod =

1876 oil painting by Gustave Moreau

- Salomé dansant devant Hérode (French)
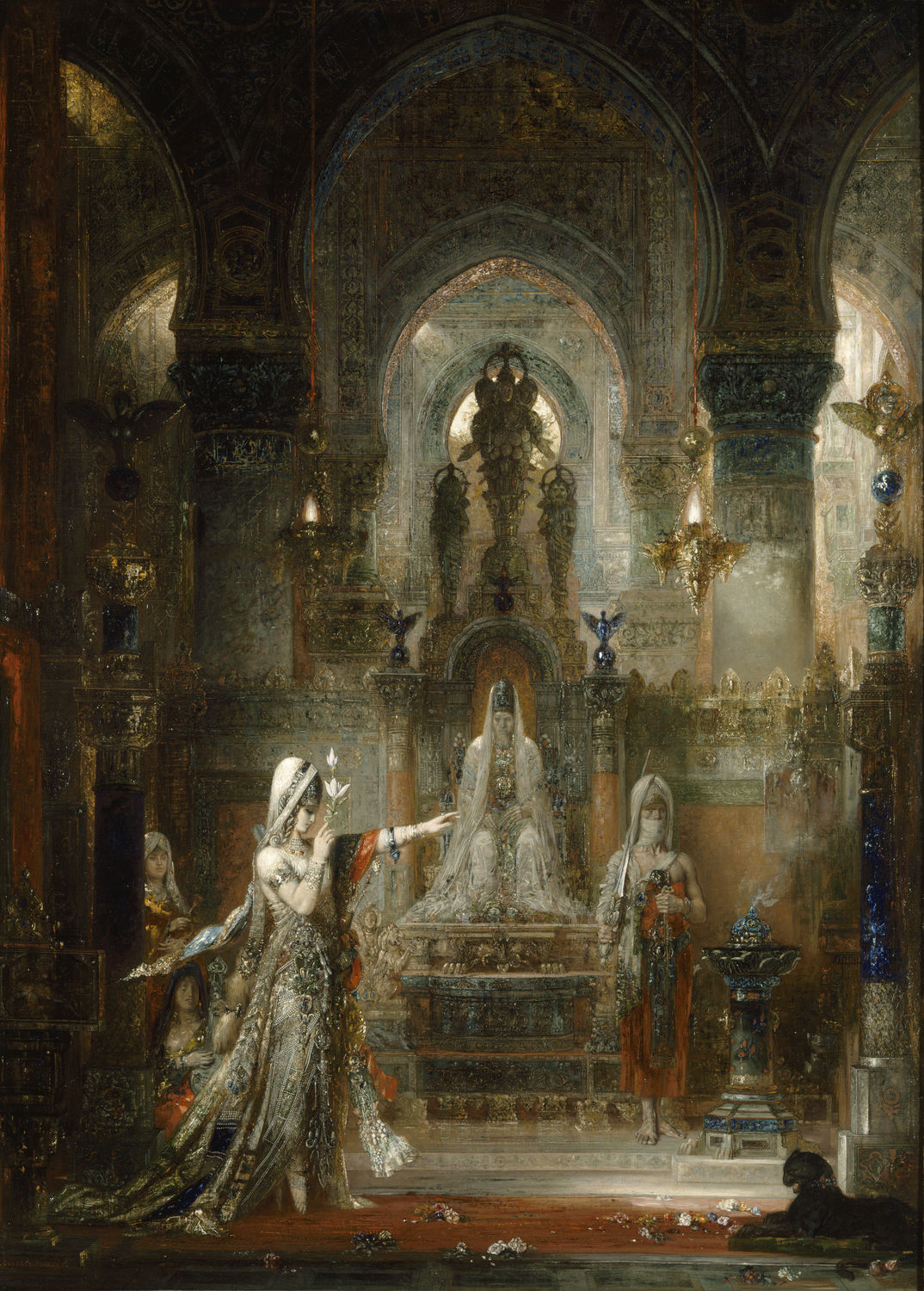
- Artist: Gustave Moreau
- Year: 1876
- Medium: Oil on canvas
- Movement: Symbolism
- Dimensions: 143.5 cm × 104.3 cm (56.5 in × 41.1 in)
- Location: Hammer Museum, Los Angeles

Salome Dancing before Herod (French: Salomé dansant devant Hérode) is an oil painting produced in 1876 by the French Symbolist artist Gustave Moreau. The subject matter is taken from the New Testament, depicting Salome—the daughter of Herod II and Herodias—dancing before Herod Antipas.

The work took Moreau seven years to paint. It created a sensation when it was exhibited for the first time in Paris at the Salon of 1876 and is arguably Moreau's most important work. The painting is kept today in the Hammer Museum in Los Angeles, United States, where an exhibition—A Strange Magic: Gustave Moreau's Salome—devoted to this painting took place in 2012.

== Description ==
The work depicts a magnificent and extraordinarily ornate palace, where Salome, standing on the tips of her toes, is performing a dance for Herod. She is wearing a sumptuously bejewelled costume, holding a lotus flower in her right hand, and extending her left arm in a rigid gesture. She appears frozen, or at most moving in a dead march. In the middle, King Herod is depicted sitting on the throne and facing the forwards, with an executioner standing on the right and a musician and Herodias on the left.

The most astounding element of this work is the fusion of different cultural elements. These have been associated with the Hagia Sophia in Istanbul, the Alhambra in Granada, the Mosque–Cathedral of Córdoba, and several mediaeval cathedrals. Motifs have been identified from Etruscan, Roman, Egyptian, Indian, and Chinese art and culture.

== Subject ==
Salome was the daughter of Herod II and Herodias. According to the Gospel of Mark, King Herod hosted a feast on his birthday for his nobles, the high officers and the chief men of Galilee. The daughter of Herodias came in and danced, pleasing Herod and those who sat with him. The king said to the girl: "Ask me whatever you want, and I will give it to you." So she went out and said to her mother: "What shall I ask?" She said: "The head of John the Baptist!" Immediately she came in with haste to the king and asked: "I want you to give me at once the head of John the Baptist on a platter." The king sent an executioner and commanded John's head to be brought. The executioner went and beheaded John in prison, brought his head on a platter, and gave it to the girl; and the girl gave it to her mother.

The name of King Herod's daughter is not stated in the New Testament, but it is Salome according to Flavius Josephus' Antiquities of the Jews. Salome became widely known as a femme fatale through the centuries, and has inspired numerous artists. The subject had become fashionable in the late 19th century; this work of art, along with Moreau's L'Apparition series, sparked a Salome craze lasting into the 20th century, permeating all forms of art. The Irish poet and playwright Oscar Wilde wrote a play titled Salome in 1891.

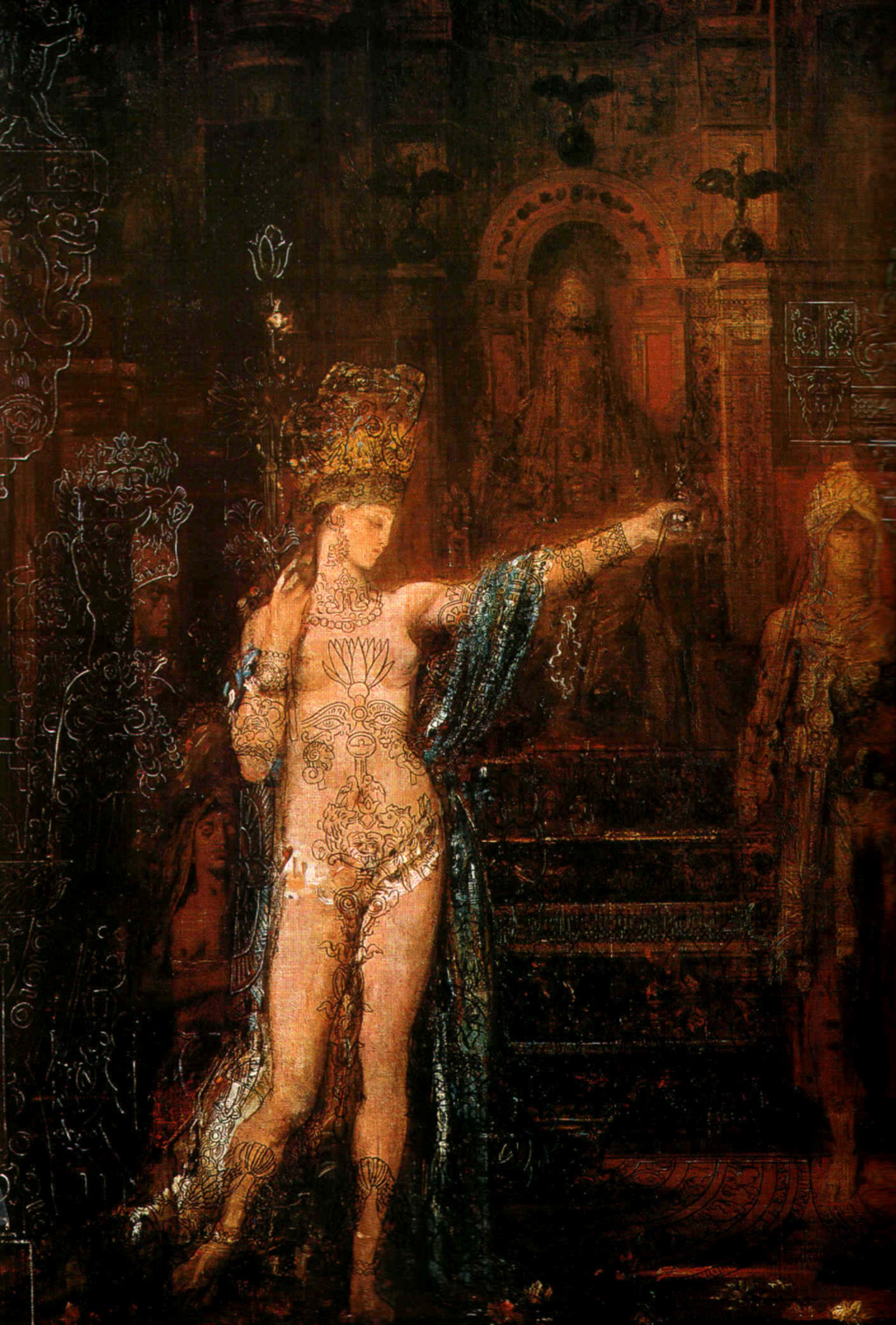
Salome Dancing, also known as Salome Tattooed, oil on canvas (undated)

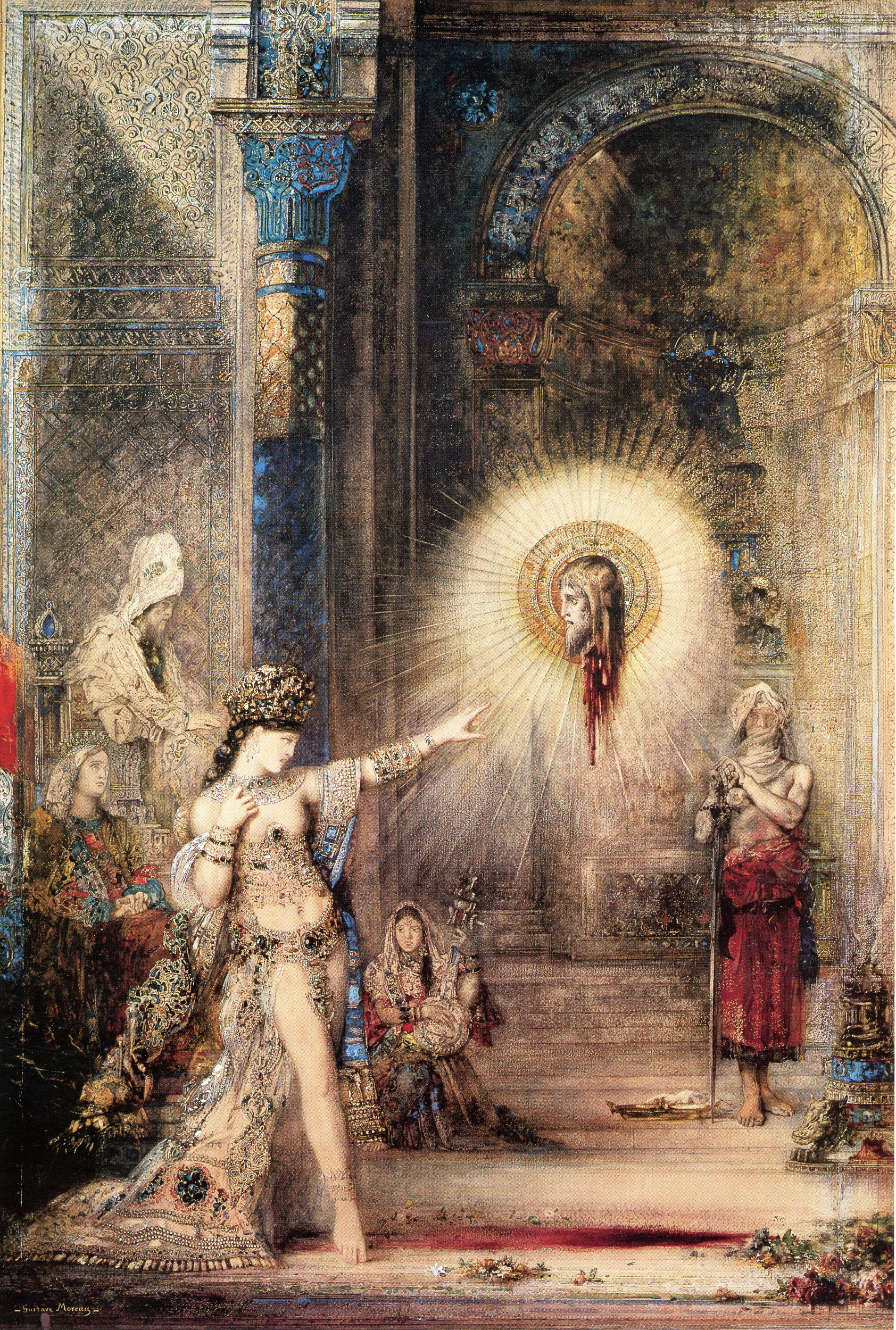
The Apparition, oil on canvas (1876)

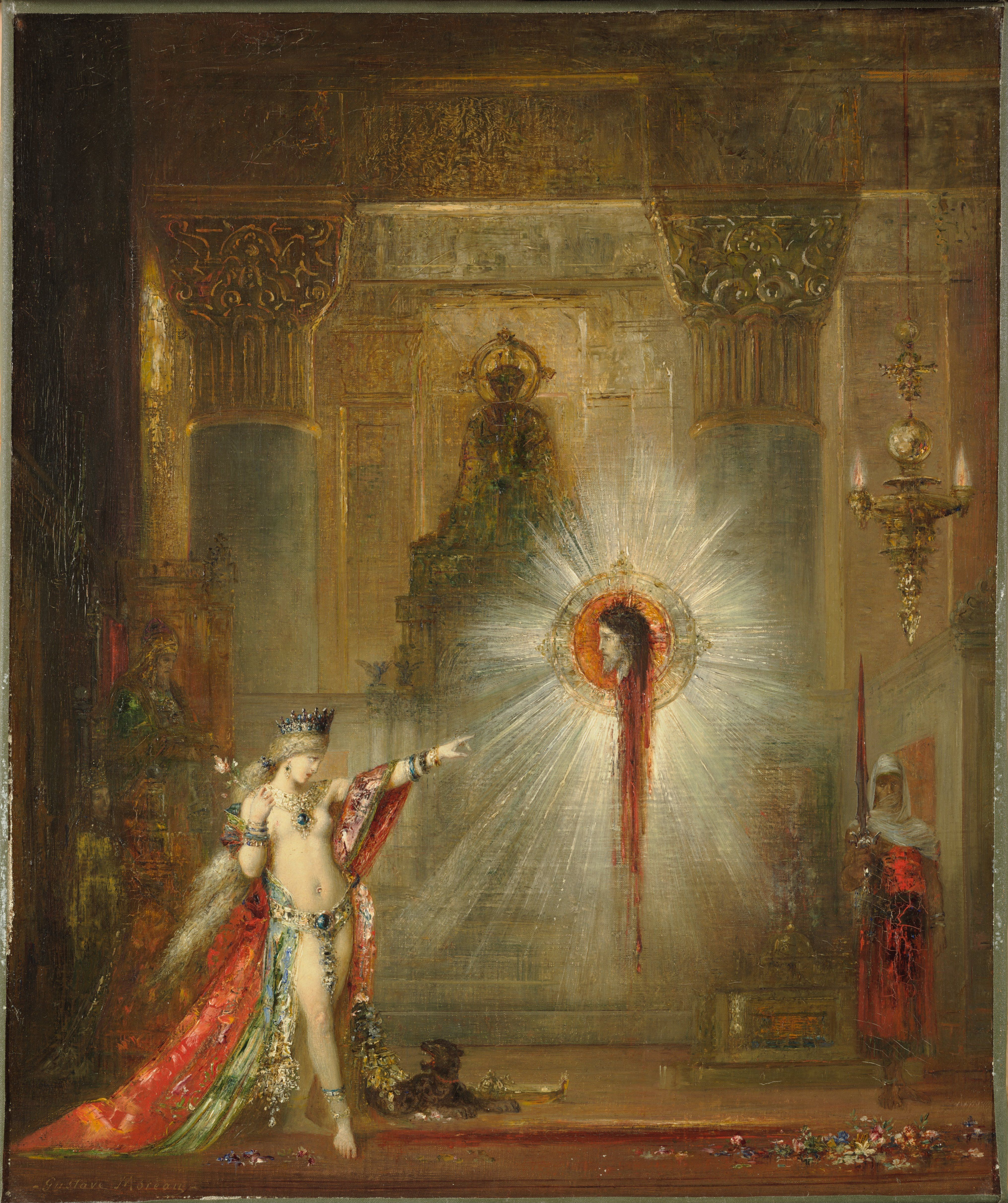
The Apparition, oil on canvas (1876/1877)

== See also ==
- The Apparition
