= Geneviève Lacambre =

French curator (born 1937)

- Born: 1937 (age 88–89); Paris, France
- Occupation: Curator
- Employer(s): Musée national Gustave Moreau, Musée d'Orsay

Geneviève Lacambre (born 1937) is a French honorary general curator of heritage, and has been the Chargée de mission at the Musée d'Orsay.

== Career ==
Curator at the department of paintings of the Louvre Museum from 1965 to 1979, then at the Musée d'Orsay until 2002. Lacambre has been for seventeen years director of the Musée national Gustave Moreau in Paris, from 1985 to 2002, a specialist of this Symbolist painter. She has published numerous articles and exhibition catalogues on Gustave Moreau and the Symbolists. She authored Gustave Moreau : Maître sorcier (Découvertes Gallimard, 1997) and organised the 1998 exhibition of Moreau at the Grand Palais in Paris before being presented in Chicago and New York. In addition to Symbolism, she also curated an exhibition in 2017 where Japonisme is the theme.

== Gustave Moreau : Maître sorcier ==
Gustave Moreau : Maître sorcier
- Author: Geneviève Lacambre
- Original title: Gustave Moreau : Maître sorcier
- Translator: Benjamin Lifson
- Cover artist: Gustave Moreau
- Language: French
- Series: Découvertes Gallimard●Peinture
- Release number: 312
- Subject: Gustave Moreau
- Genre: Nonfiction monograph
- Publisher: FR: Éditions Gallimard; US: Harry N. Abrams
- Publication date: 1997
- Publication place: France
- English publication date: 1999
- Media type: Print (Paperback)
- Pages: 128 pp.
- ISBN: 978-2-070-53388-6
- OCLC: 37228980
- Preceded by: George Sand : Un diable de femme
- Followed by: Le peuple hébreu : Entre la Bible et l'Histoire
- Website: www.gallimard.fr/Catalogue/GALLIMARD/Decouvertes-Gallimard/Decouvertes-Gallimard/Arts/Gustave-Moreau-maitre-sorcier

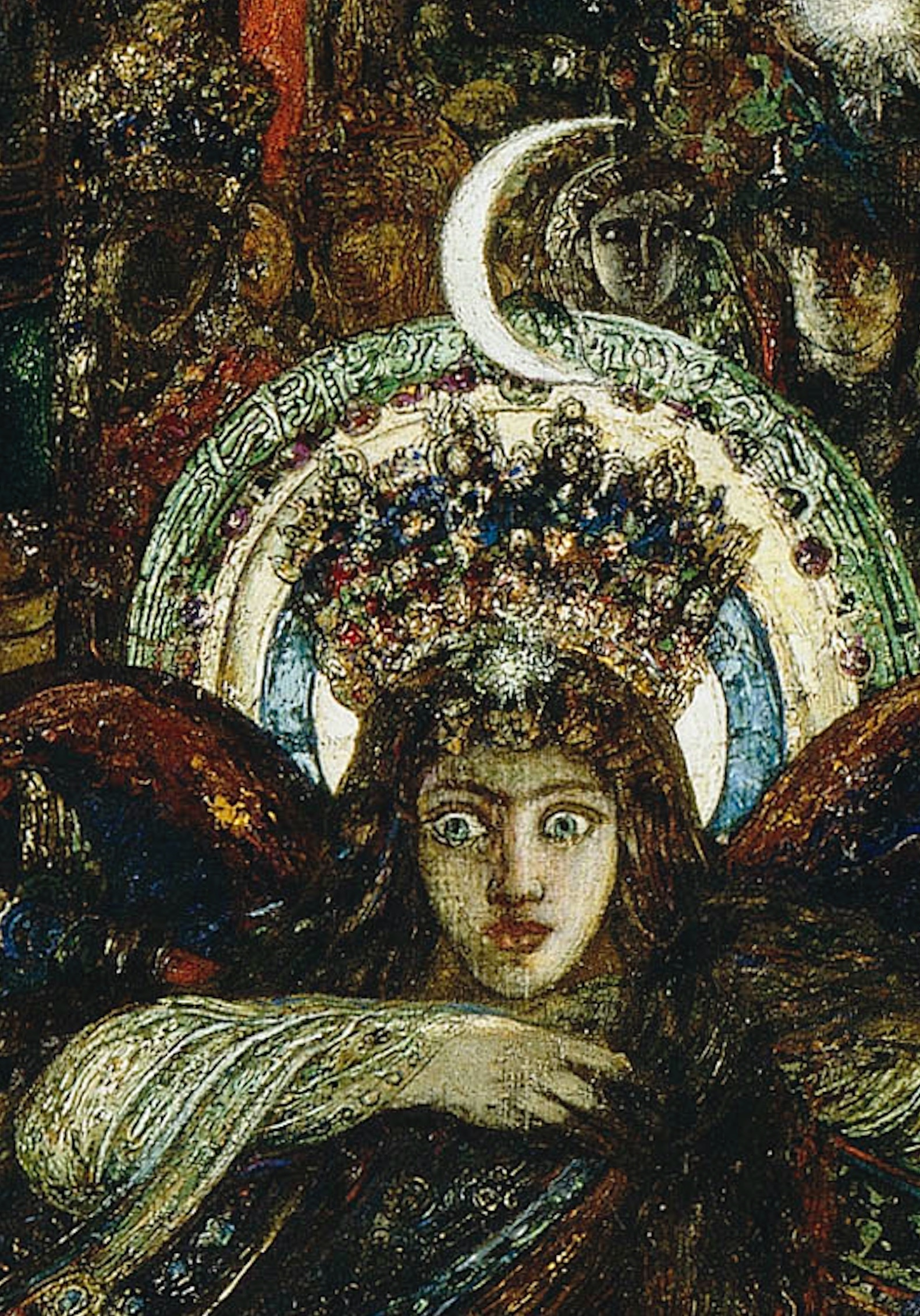
Hecate, detail of Jupiter and Semele, cover image for French edition.

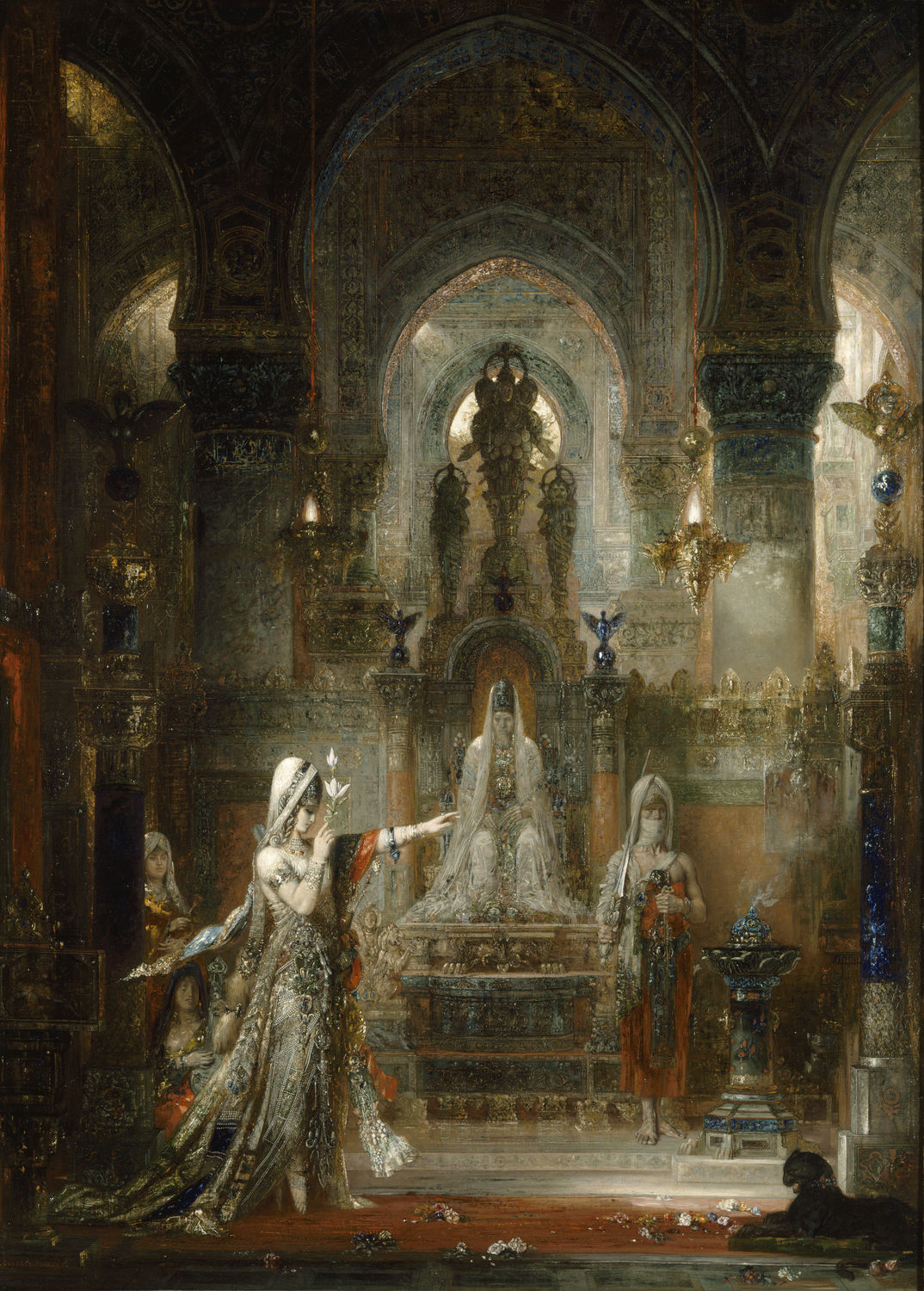
Salome Dancing before Herod, cover image for U.S. edition.

Gustave Moreau was trained in Renaissance art traditions and developed an art style that incorporated mythologies and technical aspects of painting. His work focused on mythology and mysticism, featuring subjects such as Salome, Orpheus, and Oedipus and the Sphinx.

Moreau was at the same time one of the forerunners of Symbolism and one of those who opened the way for modern art: he was the teacher of Henri Matisse and Georges Rouault. He went on to open the Gustave Moreau Museum.

Geneviève Lacambre retraces Moreau's life and artistic sources in this small colourful volume—entitled Gustave Moreau : Maître sorcier (lit. 'Gustave Moreau: Master Enchanter'; English edition – Gustave Moreau: Magic and Symbols)—with more than 120 paintings, drawings, watercolours and photographs, and an anthology of documents and letters, published by Éditions Gallimard. It is part of the Peinture series in their Découvertes collection. The book opens with seven full-page reproductions of Moreau's Jupiter and Semele and its details. The body text is divided into five chapters: I, "Uncertain Beginnings"; II, "In the School of Italy"; III, "A Hope for History Painting"; IV, "The Birth of Symbolism"; V, "A Message to Future Generations". The second part of this book is the "Documents" section containing a compilation of excerpts which is divided into five parts (pp. 97–121): 1, Moreau's writings; 2, Moreau's myths; 3, Novels and poems; 4, Critical perspectives; 5, A benevolent equal. At the end of the book are list of further reading, list of illustrations, and an index. It has been translated into American English and Japanese.

== Selected publications ==
- with Michel Laclotte and Claire Frèches-Thory, Orsay: Paintings, Editions Scala, 1989
- Gustave Moreau : Maître sorcier, coll. « Découvertes Gallimard » (nº 312), série Arts. Éditions Gallimard, 1997
  - Gustave Moreau: Magic and Symbols, "Abrams Discoveries" series. Harry N. Abrams, 1999
- with Marie-Laure de Contenson, Douglas W. Druick, et al. Gustave Moreau: Between Epic and Dream, Art Institute of Chicago, 1999
- with Gary Tinterow, Deborah L. Roldán, et al. Manet/Velázquez: The French Taste for Spanish Painting, Metropolitan Museum of Art & Yale University Press, 2002
