= The Apparition (Moreau, Musée d'Orsay) =

1876 painting by Gustave Moreau

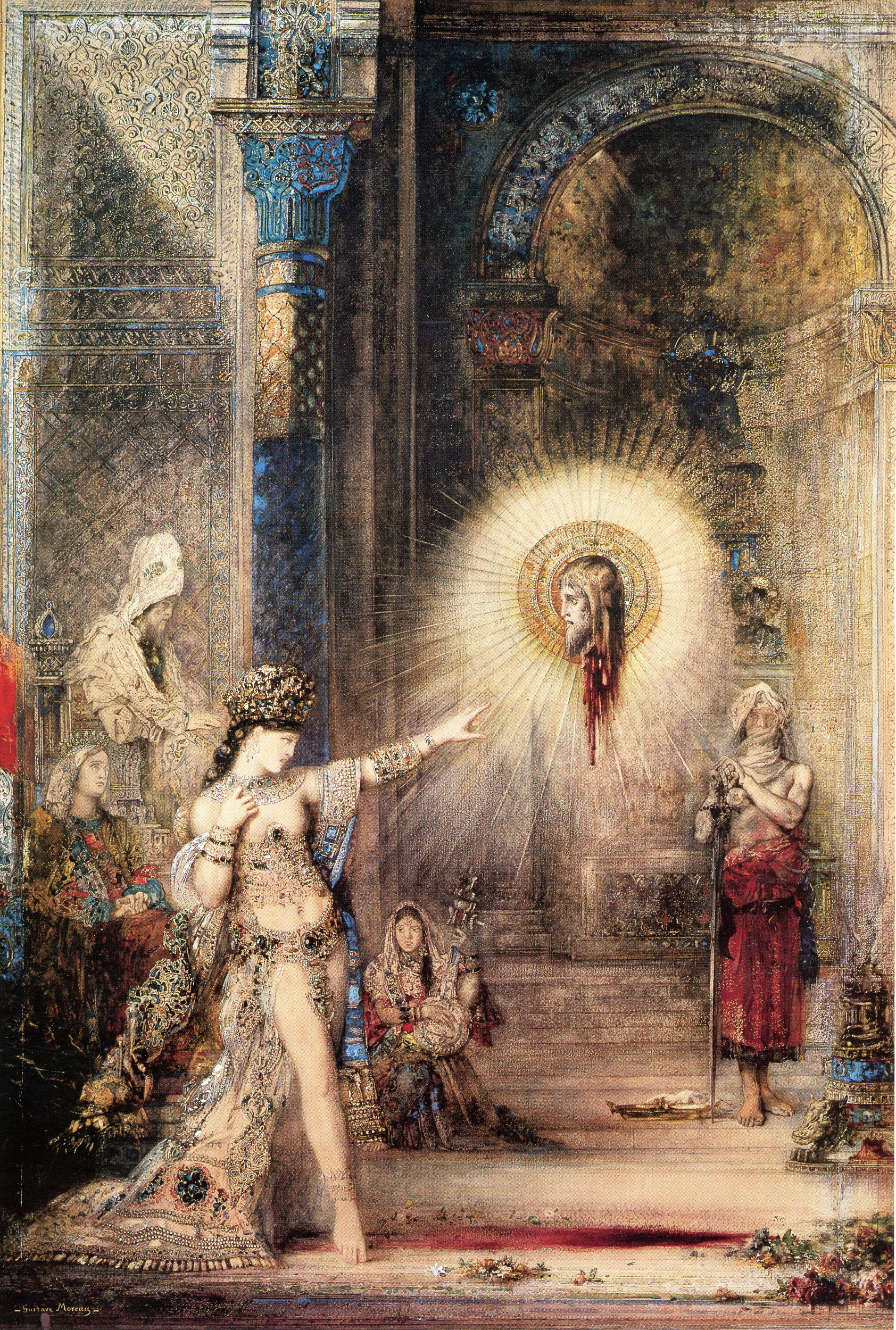
- Artist: Gustave Moreau
- Year: 1876
- Medium: watercolor
- Movement: symbolism
- Dimensions: 106 cm × 72 cm (42 in × 28 in)
- Location: Musée d'Orsay, Paris

The Apparition (French: L'Apparition) is a watercolour by French artist Gustave Moreau, painted between 1874 and 1876. It shows the biblical character of Salome dancing in front of Herod Antipas with a vision of John the Baptist's severed head. The 106 cm high and 72,2 cm wide watercolor held by the Musée d'Orsay in Paris elaborates on an episode told in the Matthew 14:6–11 and Mark 6:21–29. On a feast held for Herod Antipas's birthday, the princess Salome dances in front of the king and his guests. This pleased him so much he promises her anything she wished for. Incited by her mother Herodias, who was reproved by John the Baptist for her illegitimate marriage to Herod, Salome demands John's head on a charger. Regretful but compelled to keep his word in front of everyone present, Herod complies with Salome's demand. John the Baptist is beheaded, his head brought on a charger and given to Salome, who in turn gives it to her mother.

Moreau approached the biblical theme in 19 paintings, 6 watercolors and more than 150 drawings. Part of a series of at least 8 closely resembling paintings and more than 40 sketch drawings, it is regarded as a key work of Moreau's opus, symbolism and fin de siècle art in general. Upon its first presentation 1876 in Salon (French: Salon de Paris), the painting caused a sensation. It has since made a lasting impression on various artists, notably from the Decadent movement.

== Description ==
Against the backdrop of a lavishly decorated palace inspired by the Alhambra Salome stands out in an array of bejeweled veils, her body facing the viewer, her left arm pointing up in the air to John the Baptist's hovering head, enclosed by a halo. At the back in the half-light stands the executioner with his sword, at his feet the silver charger. Seated in ascending position on Salome's side are a lutanist, Herodias and Herod Antipas. They face the foreground events seemingly lit by John's halo and its reflections on Salome's costume. The severed head recalls a Japanese print copied by Moreau at the Palais de l'Industrie in 1869, as well as the severed head of Medusa as held by Benvenuto Cellini's bronze Perseus with the head of Medusa in Florence (Loggia dei Lanzi). Since no one, including Salome, reacts directly to the vision central to the composition, it is unclear if it is real, imagined by the princess, or a collective hallucination. This deliberately confusing technique has been attributed to an alleged consumption of opium and thereby caused hallucinations, though justification of such claims was never established. Its surreal setting and mystic air, evoked by obscure architectural and textile opulence, contrast with previous interpretations of the subject, making The Apparition a key work for the emerging symbolist movement.

Belgian art dealer Léon Gauchez bought The Apparition in 1876 upon its first presentation at the Salon where it was exhibited with several other of Moreau's works. The following year Gauchez sent it to be exhibited at London's Grosvenor Gallery where it hung not with the aquarelles in a separate room but in the main East Gallery with the oil paintings. It is currently housed in the Musée d'Orsay.

=== Style ===
"The dreadful head glows eerily, bleeding all the while, so that clots of dark red form at the ends of hair and beard." (Joris-Karl Huysmans, À Rebours, Chap. VI. 1884)

The Apparition stands apart from biblical and historic paintings of the period, incorporating elements of style which would become significant for the aesthetic and symbolist movement, while also anteceding surrealism. Whereas the Bible mentions Salome as acting out Herodias' will, Moreau draws her guided by her own lust. Among his series of Salome-paintings, the climactic The Apparition is the most openly erotic with a bare-breasted princess turned towards the viewer, her naked arm directed at the object she will soon receive. By accentuating her stillness, Moreau immobilizes her to be seen alternately as idol or sexual object or both. Some critics also ascribed her statuesque posture to fear, like French writer Joris-Karl Huysmans who muses on the painting in his influential decadent novel À rebours.

Moreau himself described Salome as a "bored and fantastic woman, animal by nature and so disgusted with the complete satisfaction of her desires (that she) gives herself the sad pleasure of seeing her enemy degraded." His sensual presentation of Salome and innovative interpretation of traditional historic and mythological themes caused his art to be regarded as eccentric and provocative. Emphasizing instincts over reason, subjectivity over objectivity and suggestion over definition, the watercolor features essential qualities of symbolism as coined by French poet and critic Jean Moréas. Further, the scene's morbidity and underlying themes of necrophilia, incest and sadism associate it with the decadent movement and Fin de siècle art. These disparate elements and the use of complex techniques like highlighting, grattage and incisions, create a sublime ideal of the Orient. Excessive detail given to foreign costumes and background elements as strange mural reliefs on the palace's columns proves characteristic of Moreau, whose artistic style tends towards exoticism and orientalism and was often referred to as "Byzantine." Together with the mysterious titular vision they both evoke fantastic art and indicate his evolution towards fauvism and abstract painting.

Rather than being solely a character from academic painting Moreau remained bound to despite his avant-garde tendencies, his Salome embodies the femme fatale of the Victorian imagination who was equally seductive and destructive. Defying conventions of historic and biblical painting, The Apparition became a source for surrealism as did others of Moreau's works.

== Motif ==
The events from which Moreau draws his scene are first described in two parallel passages of the New Testament.

"...And when the daughter of the said Herodias came in, and danced, and pleased Herod and them that sat with him, the king said unto the damsel, Ask of me whatsoever thou wilt, and I will give it thee. And he sware unto her, Whatsoever thou shalt ask of me, I will give it thee, unto the half of my kingdom. And she went forth, and said unto her mother, What shall I ask? And she said, The head of John the Baptist. And she came in straightway with haste unto the king, and asked, saying, I will that thou give me by and by in a charger the head of John the Baptist. And the king was exceeding sorry; yet for his oath's sake, and for their sakes which sat with him, he would not reject her. And immediately the king sent an executioner, and commanded his head to be brought: and he went and beheaded him in the prison, and brought his head in a charger, and gave it to the damsel: and the damsel gave it to her mother." (Mark 6:21–29, KJV)

A shorter version appears in the Gospel of St. Matthew:

"But on Herod's birthday, the daughter of Herodias danced before them: and pleased Herod. Whereupon he promised with an oath, to give her whatsoever she would ask of him. But she being instructed before by her mother, said: Give me here in a dish the head of John the Baptist. And the king was struck sad: yet because of his oath, and for them that sat with him at table, he commanded it to be given. And he sent, and beheaded John in the prison. And his head was brought in a dish: and it was given to the damsel, and she brought it to her mother." (Matt 14:6–11, D-R)

The unnamed dancer identified as Salome by scholars has inspired numerous artist before Moreau, among them Masolino da Panicale, Filippo Lippi, Lucas Cranach the Elder, Titian, Caravaggio, Guido Reni, Fabritius, Henri Regnault and Georges Rochegrosse. Though classic academic subjects from religion and history were superseded by everyday scenes during the 19th century, Salome remained a figure of artistic interest, appearing in Heinrich Heine's 1843 epic poem Atta Troll, The Beheading of John the Baptist by Pierre Puvis de Chavannes, Henri Regnault's eponymous oil painting and Arthur O'Shaughnessy's 1870 poem The Daughter of Herodias. In his 1875 poem Salomé, Henri Cazaliz's paid homage to Moreau's earlier Salome-paintings, musing on Salome’s feelings before and after the execution. In fact, it was Moreau's The Apparition and its sister piece — an oil version also called The Apparition (1875) — that sparked a Salome craze which lasted into the 20th century and permeated all forms of art.

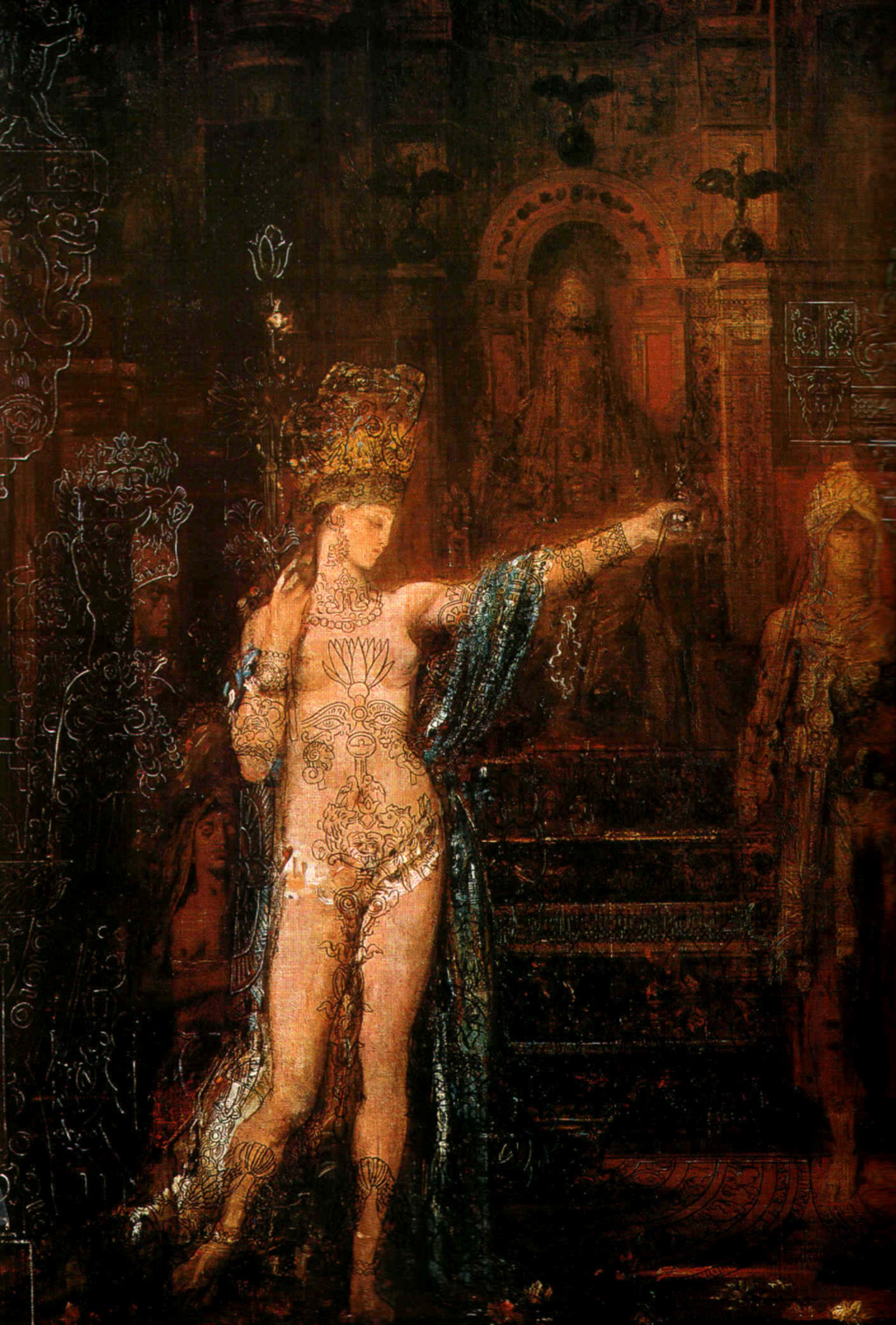
Salomé dansant devant Hérode (1876)

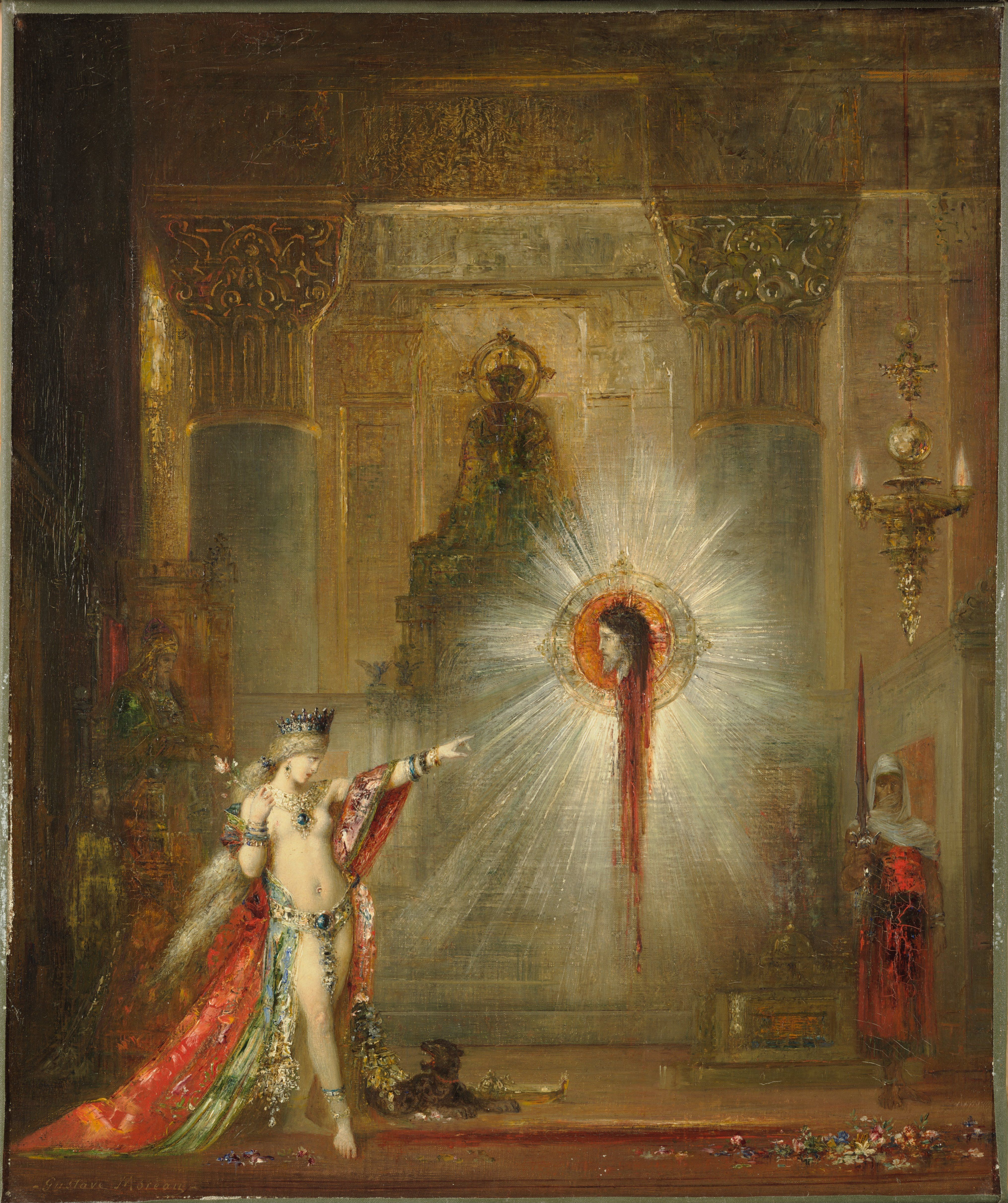
The Apparition oil on canvas (1876/1877)

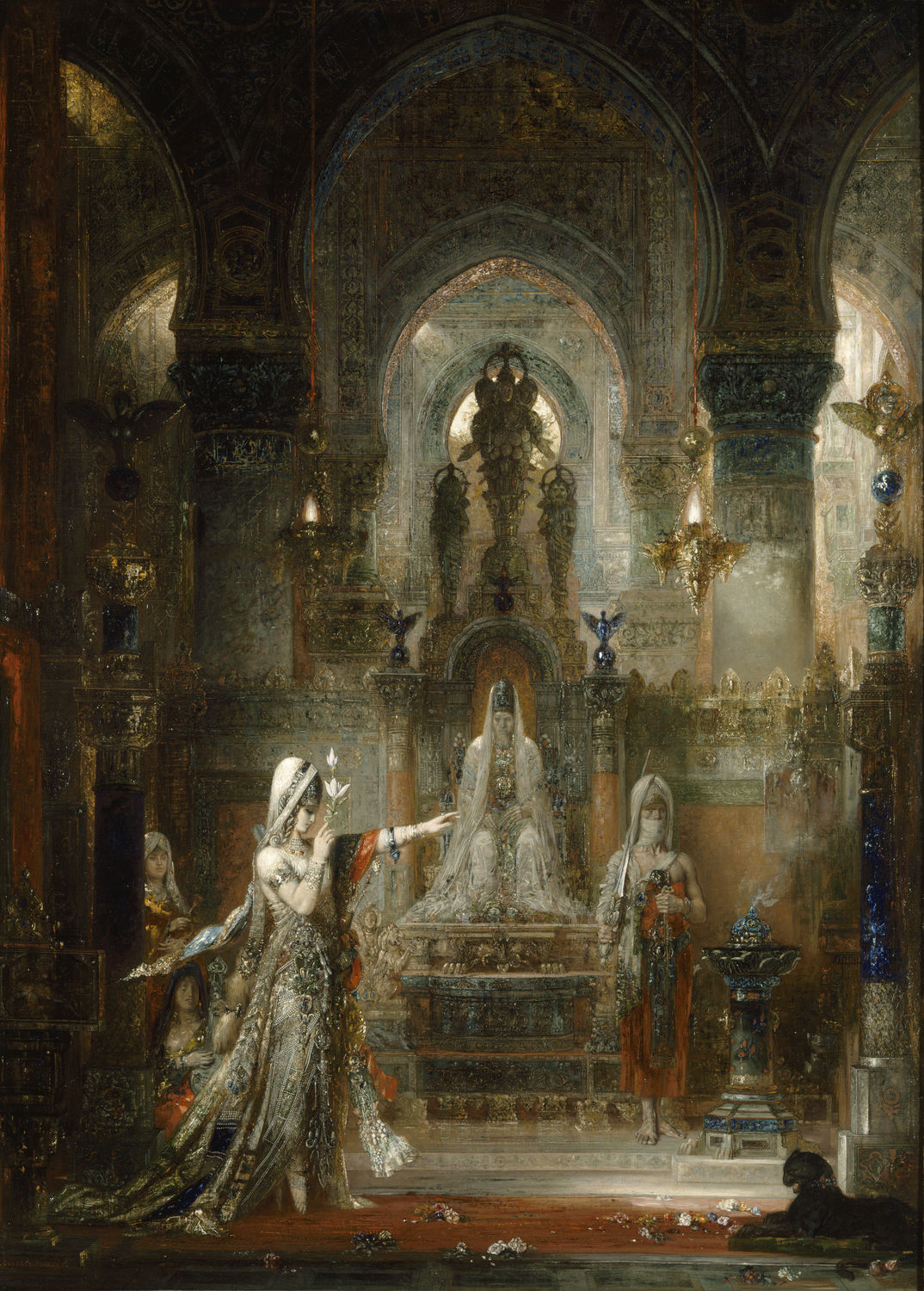
Salome Dancing before Herod, oil on canvas (1876)

== Impact ==
The Apparition quickly became Moreau's best known work, its notoriety growing with the critical and artistic attention it received. Numerous artist drew inspiration from Moreau's Salome, her mimesis infusing their works or insinuating itself in it. French poet Stéphane Mallarmé envisions Salome in his Herodiade (1864–1896) as the virgin-whore seen by many of Moreau's contemporaries

"The horror of my virginity
Delights me, and I would envelope me
In the terror of my tresses, that, by night,
Inviolate reptile, I might feel the white
And glimmering radiance of thy frozen fire,
Thou art chaste and diest of desire,
White night of ice and of the cruel snow!"

As André Fontainas noted 1928 in Mes souvenirs du Symbolisme, many artists since responded to it. Prominent works influenced by the painting include:

- Jules Massenet's Herodiade (1877)
- Odilon Redon's Salome with the Head of John the Baptist and Apparition
- Gustave Flaubert's short story Herodias from his Three Tales
- Famously, Oscar Wilde wrote his symbolist play Salome (1893) after being impressed by The Apparition viewing it in 1884 at the Louvre
- Richard Strauss' opera Salome, based on Wilde's play
- Antoine Mariotte's opera Salome, also based on Wilde's Salome
- Nick Cave's theatrical dialogue Salome

When the renown of its creator faded, The Apparition contained its prominent place in artistic imagination, its lasting impressiveness being crucial to the rediscovery of Moreau's art in the later 20th century.

== See also ==
- Salome Dancing before Herod
