= Les Chimères (painting) =

Unfinished painting by Gustave Moreau

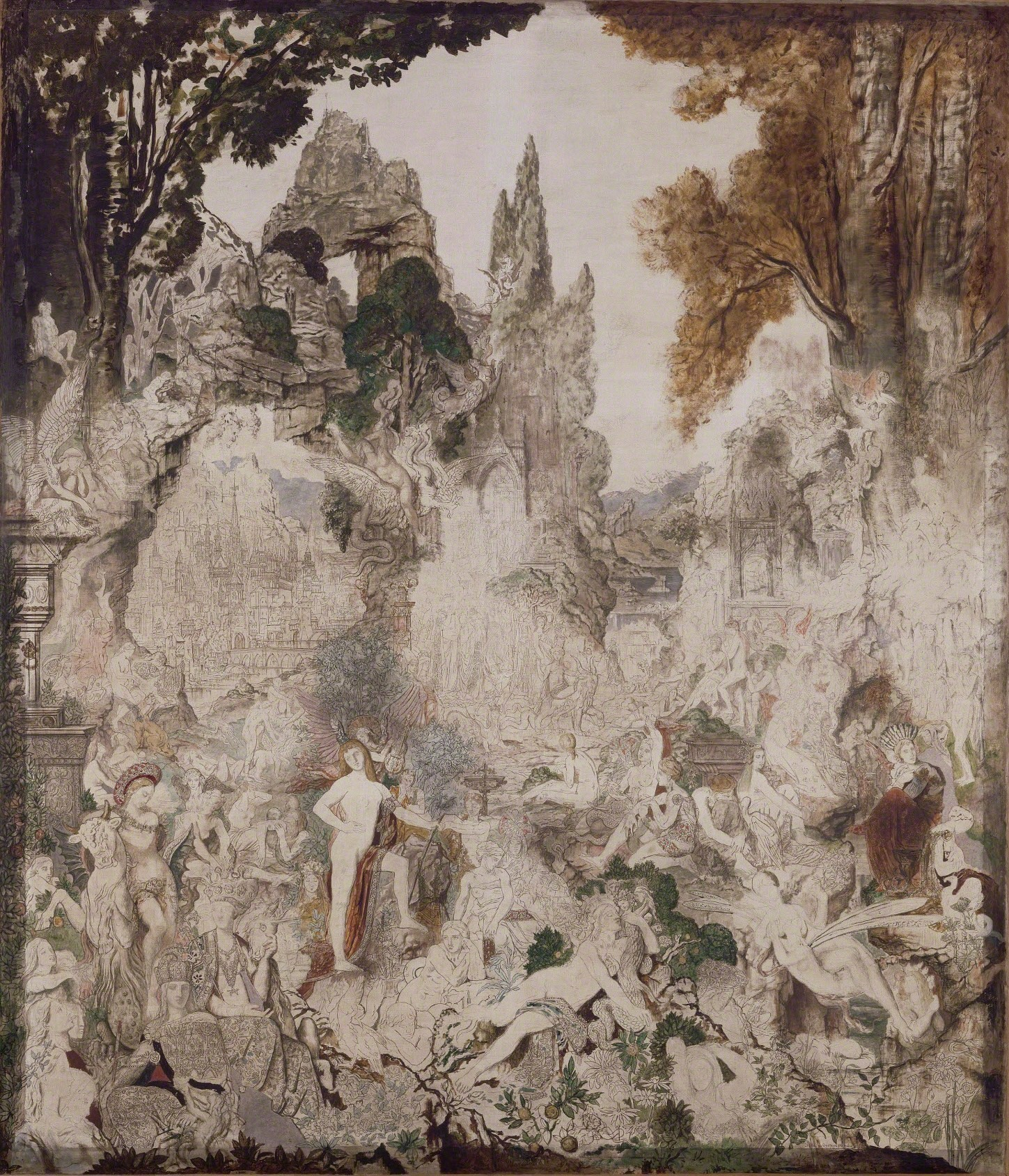
- Artist: Gustave Moreau
- Year: 1884
- Medium: Oil on canvas
- Dimensions: 236 cm × 204 cm (92.9 in × 80.3 in)
- Location: Musée national Gustave Moreau, Paris

Les Chimères or The Chimaeras is an unfinished painting executed in 1884 by the French Symbolist painter Gustave Moreau (1826–1898). It depicts a large forest scene wherein various nude women are associated with sundry figures from classical and medieval mythology—not only the titular chimeras, but also centaurs, winged creatures, fawns, minotaurs, etc. The painting is a philosophical meditation on what Moreau saw as the elemental nature of Woman, depicting the internal yearnings and dreams of women (des chimères being a French idiom indicating unrealistic dreams) through complex mythological symbolism. Moreau abandoned the work shortly after his mother's death to work on the darker polyptych La Vie de l'Humanité, considered one of his masterpieces.

== The painting ==
Executed on a 2.36m by 2.04m canvas, Les Chimères is in the Musée national Gustave Moreau at 14 Rue de La Rochefoucauld, Paris. The scene, like many of Moreau's other pieces, is in nature—a forest—but filled with figures that blend with and complete the scenery. While still adhering to Neoclassical conventions of form, Moreau fills the canvas with creations of his own imagination. A nude woman being courted by a centaur is the focal point, while other women and their respective chimères, here taken in the meaning of "fantasies" or "dreams," not only literally, fill out the piece. The fact that the painting was abandoned means that many, if not most of these figures are only sketched out and not left a pale white, with the sky being the same white—this creates a haze in the middle of the piece and also gives the effect of Classical marble statuary to the various figures.

== The Chimera ==
The theme of the chimera is originally from Classical mythology, where the chimera was a fearsome fire-breathing beast with the heads of a lion, a goat, and a dragon, the last one attached to its tail. The chimera romped about Lycia, spreading havoc, until slain by the hero Bellerophon on his winged steed, the Pegasus. In the Middle Ages, however, the chimera took a new meaning, representing the perverse forces of the Devil as in Dante's Inferno and, later, hypocrisy and fraud, as in the Iconologia of Cesare Ripa. In France, une chimère had the additional idiomatic meaning of an illusion or delusion; all these various connotations no doubt influenced Moreau, who began no less than half a dozen paintings with variations on the theme.

== Interpretation ==
Once criticized as being "too literary for a painter", Gustave Moreau was a proponent of painting as cosa mentale, or mental matter—that is, painting as a philosophical expression. According to his own writings, Les Chimères is a depiction of the internal, primitive nature of women. "[These] fantastic dreams enclose all the forms of the passions, the fantasy, the caprice of Woman, Woman in her first aspect, an unconscious being, a well of ... mystery, a spirit of evil under the form of perverse and Satanic seduction."

The various fantastical images associated with the women in the painting are manifestations of the internal will and spirit of these women, a will and spirit that, for Moreau, was at the same time weak and mysterious, profound and susceptible to temptation. Moreau is here hearkening back to the primal, mythological archetype of Woman, back to not only Eve and the apple but Pandora and her box or Helen and Troy –the idea that women, both captured by and capturers of dreams, or imagination, act as conduits into the unconscious, eternal world of which, according to Symbolism, this world is only a reflection, a shadow on a wall, like Plato's Cave.

== Artistic influences ==
Moreau, who traveled in Italy for nearly a decade, was influenced by, among other things, Michelangelo's depiction of the human form and Leonardo da Vinci, with whom he shared a similar sense of color (Moreau and Leonardo's light blues are very similar) and a similar philosophical disposition. Like Leonardo, Moreau believed that painters ought not to strive to simply reproduce scenes from nature, but to organize a scene from nature on a canvas in such a way as to provide a spiritual insight, going so far as to call painting "the language of God." In Les Chimères, one sees the influence of Leonardo in the effeminate figure of a man near the center of the painting, a figure which is uncannily similar to Leonardo's depictions of both St. John the Baptist and the Apostle John, even down to the hair and the cryptic smile. In addition to these Renaissance influences, Moreau followed in the footsteps of Nicolas Poussin, another philosophically-disposed painter, and also partly the Neoclassicists, with whom he shared a love of proportion, accurate form, and harmony of composition.

In the thrust of his work, however, Moreau was thoroughly within the Symbolist school, and preceded certain parts of it. The Symbolist Manifesto, published by Jean Moréas two years after Moreau stopped working on Les Chimères, states that in the work of the Symbolist artist, "all ... real world phenomena will not be described for their own sake; here, they are perceptible surfaces created to represent their esoteric affinities with the primordial Ideals." Les Chimères is exemplary of this idea of capturing the absolute Ideal through sensory description—the setting in nature, the presence of the mythological creatures, the sensuousness of the women, etc., are significant not in themselves but in so far as they capture and reflect the absolute Ideal of Woman as seen by Moreau and the mythological tradition, Woman as elemental, primordial, mysterious.

== See also ==
- Visionary art
- Platonism
- Decadence
