= The Apparition (Moreau, Musée national Gustave Moreau) =

Painting by Gustave Moureau

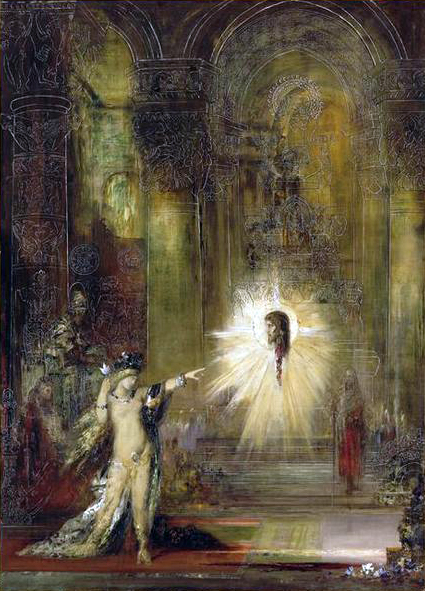
- Artist: Gustave Moreau
- Year: c. 1875
- Medium: oil on canvas
- Movement: symbolism
- Dimensions: 142 cm × 103 cm (56 in × 41 in)
- Location: Musée national Gustave Moreau; Paris

The Apparition is a c. 1875 oil on canvas painting by Gustave Moreau. It is now in the Musée Gustave Moreau in Paris.
