= Jupiter and Semele =

Painting by Gustave Moreau

Jupiter et Sémélé
- Jupiter and Semele (English)
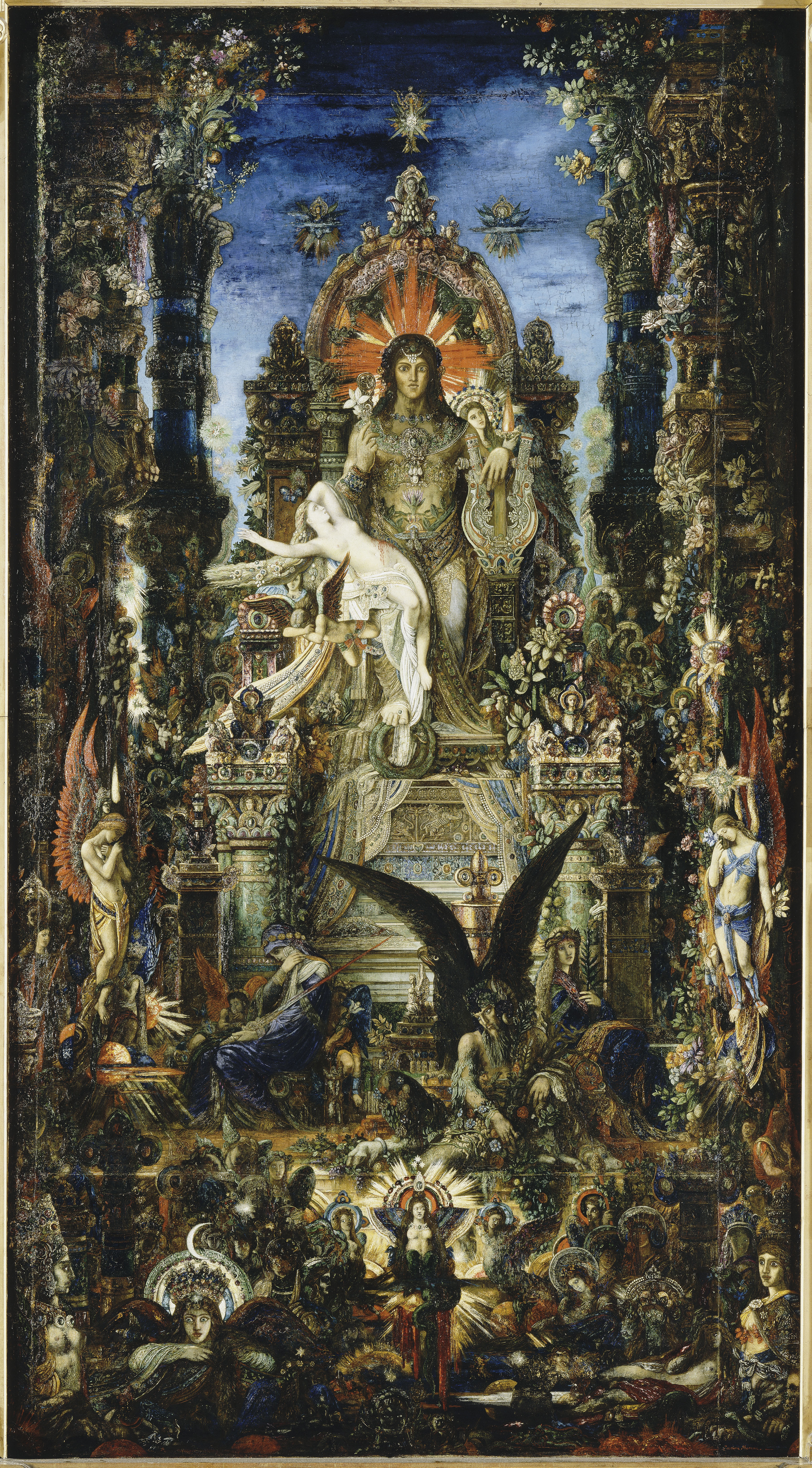
- Artist: Gustave Moreau
- Year: 1894–95
- Type: Oil on canvas
- Dimensions: 213 cm × 118 cm (83.8 in × 46.5 in)
- Location: Musée National Gustave-Moreau (Moreau Museum); Paris

Jupiter et Sémélé (1894–95; English, Jupiter and Semele) is a painting by the French Symbolist artist Gustave Moreau (1826–1898). It depicts a moment from the classical myth of the mortal woman Semele, mother of the god Dionysus, and her lover, Jupiter, the king of the gods. She was treacherously advised by the goddess Juno, Jupiter's wife, to ask him to appear to her in all his divine splendor. He obliged, but, in so doing, brought about her violent death by his divine thunder and lightning. The painting is a representation of "divinized physical love" and the overpowering experience that consumes Semele as the god appears in his supreme beauty which has been called "quite simply the most sumptuous expression imaginable of an orgasm".

Of this work, Moreau himself wrote, "Semele, penetrated by the divine effluence, regenerated and purified by this consecration, dies struck by lightning and with her dies the genius of terrestrial love, the genius with the goat hooves."

== Description ==
Moreau described his canvas thus:

"In the midst of colossal aerial buildings, with neither foundations nor roof-tops, covered with teeming, quivering vegetation, this sacred flora standing out against the dark blues of the starry vaults and the deserts of the sky, the God so often invoked appears in his still veiled splendor."

— Gustave Moreau

Moreau's work depicts an intricate, intense, and startling mystical world, haunting and heavily laden with symbolic imagery. Its iconography is drawn from the ancient myth, from Symbolist writings and from his own personal interpretations, which are deliberately meant to be mysterious and ambiguous. Jupiter is represented conventionally, seated "in Majesty" with the hapless and bloodied Semele astride his right thigh. His gaze is severe, wide-eyed and fixed straight ahead in fierce prepossession. His throne and surrounding court, however, present an unorthodox and extravagant profusion of architectural and vegetal elements which — while depicted in fine, realistic, even jewel-like, detail — give the overall impression of a dream-like fantasy world. Everywhere a profusion of vivid colors vies with dark shadows for prominence. Countless teeming gods, goddesses and allegorical figures seem to exist at different scales, independent of, and oblivious to, one another. The eye must accommodate bizarre shifts in proportion as it ranges across the canvas. Among the figures are three immediately at the feet of Jupiter: a figure of "Sadness" (cradling a bloodied sword), a Great Pan, and a female "Death" holding aloft a white lily. (Moreau: "At the foot of the throne, Death and Sorrow form the tragic basis of Human Life, and not far from them, under the aegis of the eagle of Jupiter, the great Pan, symbol of Earth, bows his sorrowful brow, mourning his slavery and exile, while at his feet is piled the somber phalanx of the monsters of Erebus and Night….") Jupiter's right foot rests on a snake biting its own tail. A frightful Hecate, with her polos and crescent moon, appears in the lower left corner. Among the other figures are a three-headed demon and several winged, angelic figures.

== Reception and interpretation ==
The French writer and painter Malcolm de Chazal (1902–1981) called the central image of Jupiter and Semele "this birth-death in one". The Swedish surrealist Ragnar von Holten (1934–2009) described the work as "an allegory of regeneration by death".

The theme of Jupiter and Semele has also been interpreted by the painters Jacopo Tintoretto (ca. 1545) and Jean-Baptiste Deshays de Colleville (ca. 1760).

== See also ==
- La petite mort
