= Musée national Gustave Moreau =

Art museum in Paris, France

Musée Gustave-Moreau
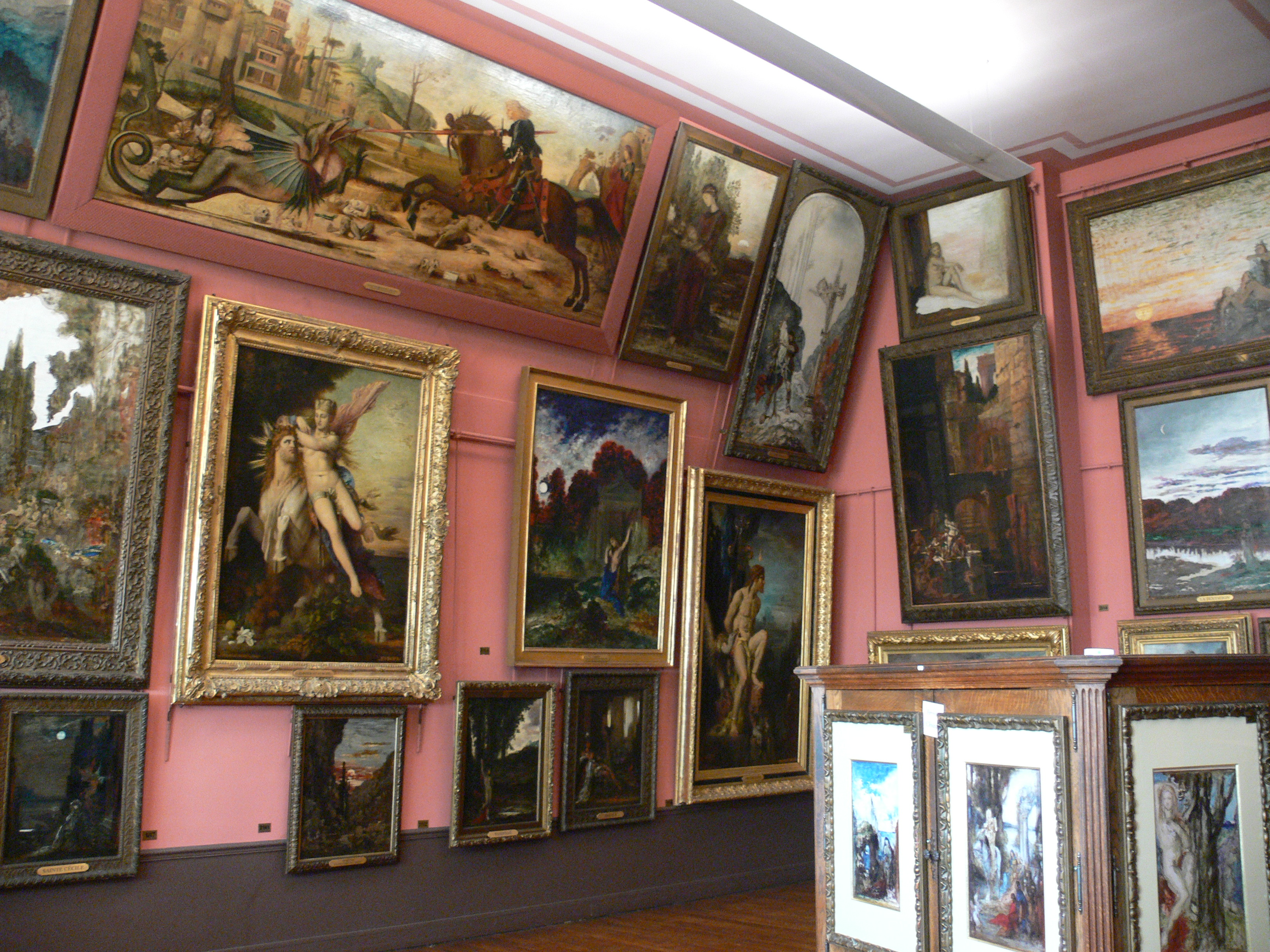
- Interior

- Location within Paris
- Established: 14 January 1903; 123 years ago
- Location: 14, rue Catherine-de-La Rochefoucauld, 75009 Paris, France
- Coordinates: 48.8779599°N 2.3343623°E
- Collection size: Paintings, designs, sculptures
- Website: www.musee-moreau.fr

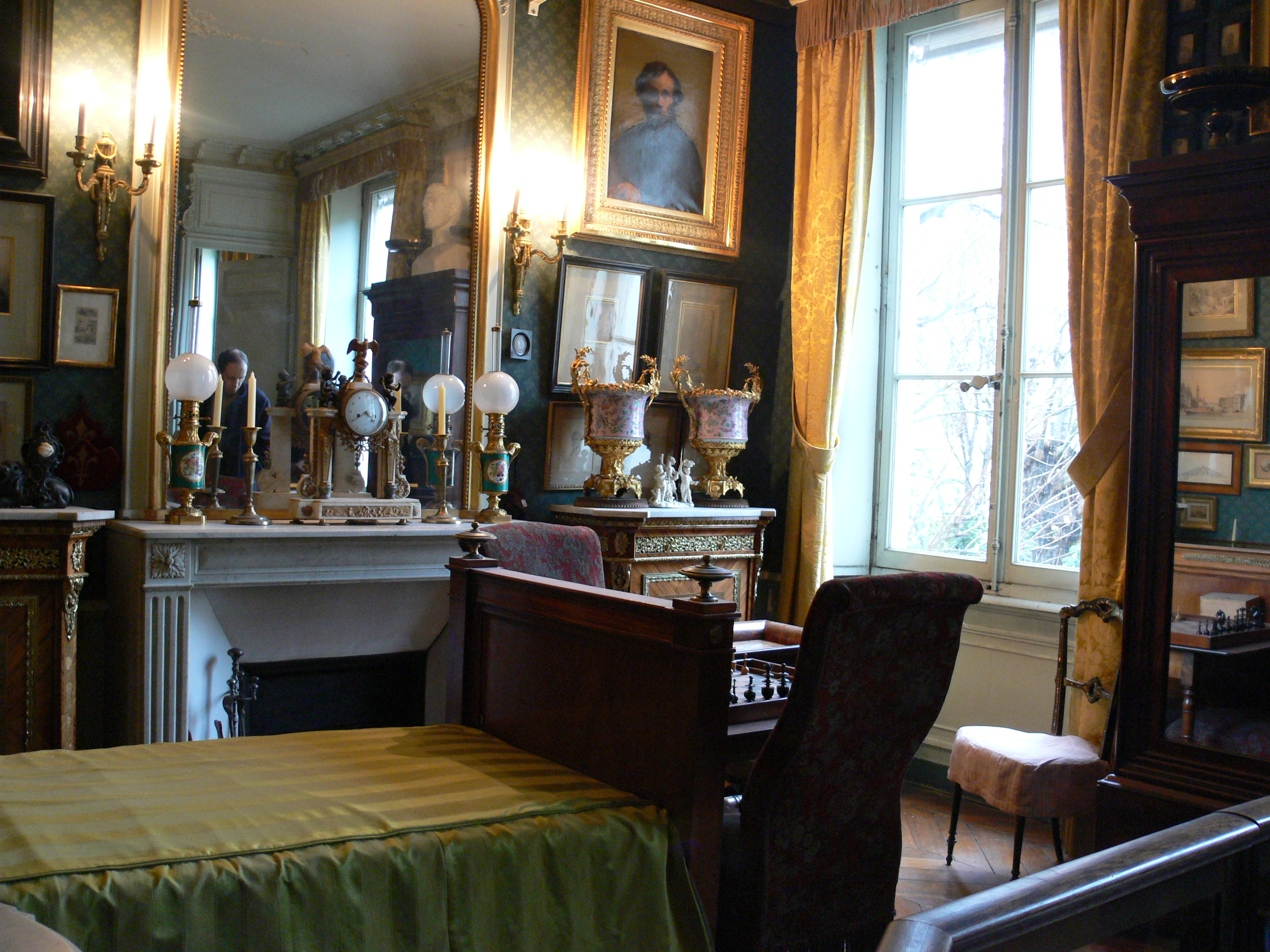
Moreau's apartment

The Musée national Gustave Moreau (French pronunciation: [myze nɑsjɔnal ɡystav mɔʁo]; transl. "National Gustave Moreau Museum") is an art museum dedicated to the works of Symbolist painter Gustave Moreau (1826–1898). It is located in the 9th arrondissement of Paris at 14, rue de la Rochefoucauld, Paris, France.

The museum was originally Moreau's dwelling, transformed by his 1895 decision into a studio and museum of his work with his apartment remaining on the first floor. Today the museum contains Moreau's drawings, paintings, watercolors, and sculptures.

== Description ==
The building has three floors. Of the six small rooms on the ground floor overlooking a garden, four rooms are decorated with drawings and sketches which are dedicated to the Italian masters. The first floor apartment (one dining room, one bedroom, a den and a hallway and an office-library) reminds the gallery patrons of its original purpose as the dwelling place of the Moreau family. The second floor has a large studio-room, and the third floor has two rooms of a larger format. The collection consists of around 1200 paintings (mostly sketches or unfinished), pastels or watercolors and 4830 drawings kept in cabinets, and cupboards with pivoting shutters and wholesale inventory numbers, drawn by Moreau himself, with nearly 5000 drawings (7800 aside).

Among the exhibits: The Apparition (c.1875), Jupiter and Semele (1895), Chimera (1884), and The Return of the Argonauts (1891–97).

== Visiting ==
The nearest métro stations are Saint-Georges and Trinité – d'Estienne d'Orves. The Museum is open daily except Tuesday; an admission fee (€7.5 as of May 2010) is charged.

== See also ==
- List of museums in Paris
- List of single-artist museums
