= Semen analysis =

Scientific analysis of semen

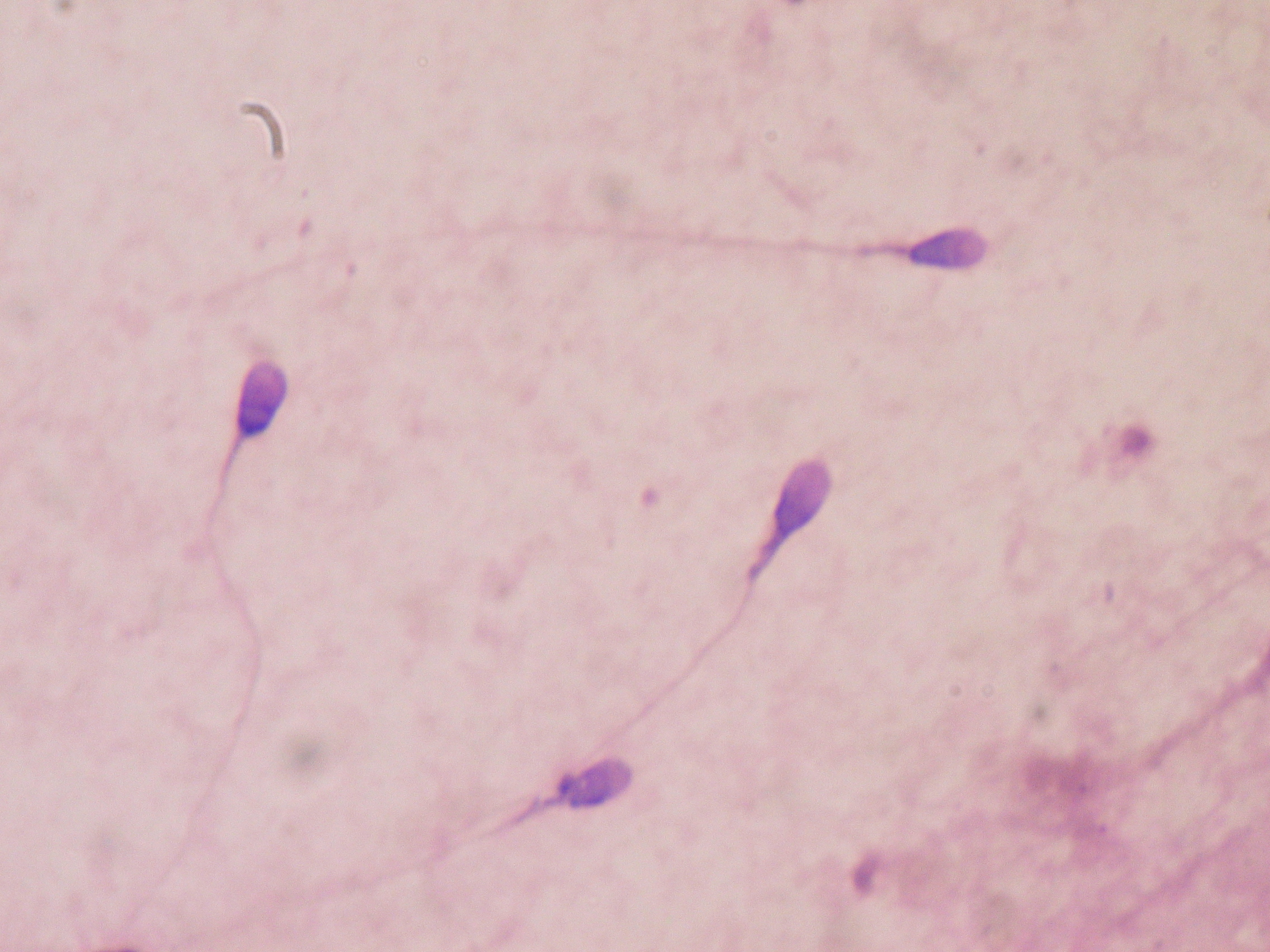
- Human sperm stained for semen quality testing in the clinical laboratory
- MedlinePlus: 003627
- HCPCS-L2: G0027

A semen analysis (plural: semen analyses), also called seminogram or spermiogram, evaluates certain characteristics of a male's semen and the sperm contained therein. It is done to help evaluate male fertility, whether for those seeking pregnancy or verifying the success of vasectomy. Depending on the measurement method, just a few characteristics may be evaluated (such as with a home kit) or many characteristics may be evaluated (generally by a diagnostic laboratory). Collection techniques and precise measurement method may influence results. The assay is also referred to as ejaculate analysis, human sperm assay (HSA), sperm function test, and sperm assay.

Semen analysis is a complex test that should be performed in andrology laboratories by experienced technicians with quality control and validation of test systems. A routine semen analysis should include: physical characteristics of semen (color, odor, pH, viscosity and liquefaction), volume, concentration, morphology and sperm motility and progression. To provide a correct result it is necessary to perform at least two, preferably three, separate seminal analyses with an interval between them of seven days to three months.

The techniques and criteria used to analyze semen samples are based on the WHO manual for the examination of human semen and sperm-cervical mucus interaction published in 2021.

== Reasons for testing ==
The most common reasons for laboratory semen analysis in humans are as part of a couple's infertility investigation and after a vasectomy to verify that the procedure was successful. It is also commonly used for testing human donors for sperm donation, and for animals semen analysis is commonly used in stud farming and farm animal breeding.

Occasionally a man will have a semen analysis done as part of routine pre-pregnancy testing. At the laboratory level this is rare, as most healthcare providers will not test the semen and sperm unless specifically requested or there is a strong suspicion of a pathology in one of these areas discovered during the medical history or during the physical examination. Such testing is very expensive and time-consuming, and in the U.S. is unlikely to be covered by insurance. In other countries, such as Germany, the testing is covered by all insurances.

== Relation to fertility ==
The characteristics measured by semen analysis are only some of the factors in semen quality. One source states that 30% of men with a normal semen analysis actually have abnormal sperm function. Conversely, men with poor semen analysis results may go on to father children. In NICE guidelines, mild male factor infertility is defined as when two or more semen analyses have one or more variables below the 5th percentile, and confers a chance of pregnancy occurring naturally through vaginal intercourse within two years similar to people with mild endometriosis.

== Collection methods ==
Methods of semen collection include masturbation, condom collection, and epididymal extraction. The sample should never be obtained through coitus interruptus as some portion of the ejaculate could be lost, bacterial contamination could occur, or the acidic vaginal pH could be detrimental for sperm motility. The optimal sexual abstinence for semen sampling is two to seven days. The most common way to obtain a semen sample is through masturbation or withdrawal method and the best place to obtain it is in the clinic where the analysis will take place in order to avoid temperature changes during the transport that can be lethal for some spermatozoa. Once the sample is obtained, it must be put directly into a sterile plastic receptacle (never in a conventional condom, since they have chemical substances such as lubricants or spermicides that could damage the sample) and be handed to the clinic for it to be studied within the hour.

There are some situations that necessitate alternative collection methods, such as retrograde ejaculation, neurological injury or psychological inhibition. Depending on the situation, specialized condoms, electrostimulation or vibrostimulation might be used.

== Parameters ==
The parameters included in the semen analysis can be divided in macroscopic (liquefaction, appearance, viscosity, volume and pH) and microscopic (motility, morphology, vitality, concentration, sperm count, sperm aggregation, sperm agglutination, and presence of round cells or leukocytes). The main three parameters of the spermiogram are the concentration of the spermatozoa in the semen, the motility and the morphology of them. This analysis is important to analyse fertility, but even in a perfectly fertile man is very difficult to find normal spermatozoa. For the average fertile man, only 4% of their spermatozoa are normal in every parameter, while 96% are abnormal in at least one of them.

=== Sperm count ===
Approximate pregnancy rate varies with amount of sperm used in an artificial insemination cycle. Values are for intrauterine insemination, with sperm number in total sperm count, which may be approximately twice the total motile sperm count.

Sperm count, or sperm concentration to avoid confusion with total sperm count, measures the concentration of sperm in ejaculate, distinguished from total sperm count, which is the sperm count multiplied with volume. Over 16 million sperm per milliliter is considered normal, according to the WHO in 2021. Older definitions state 20 million. A lower sperm count is considered oligozoospermia. A vasectomy is considered successful if the sample is azoospermic (zero sperm of any kind found). Cryptozoospermia is when a sample contains less than 100,000 spermatozoa per milliliter. Some define success as when rare/occasional non-motile sperm are observed (fewer than 100,000 per millilitre). Others advocate obtaining a second semen analysis to verify the counts are not increasing (as can happen with re-canalization) and others still may perform a repeat vasectomy for this situation.

Chips for home use are emerging that can give an accurate estimation of sperm count after three samples taken on different days. Such a chip may measure the concentration of sperm in a semen sample against a control liquid filled with polystyrene beads.

=== Sperm motility ===
The World Health Organization has a value of 40% and this must be measured within 60 minutes of collection. WHO also has a parameter of vitality, with a lower reference limit of 60% live spermatozoa. A man can have a total number of sperm far over the limit of >16 million sperm cells per milliliter, but still have bad quality because too few of them are motile. However, if the sperm count is very high, then a low motility (for example, less than 60%) might not matter, because the fraction might still be more than 8 million per millilitre. The other way around, a man can have a sperm count far less than 20 million sperm cells per millilitre and still have good motility, if more than 60% of those observed sperm cells show good forward movement — which is beneficial because nature favours quality over quantity.

A more specified measure is motility grade, where the total motility(PR+NP) and immotile.

Progressively motile- Sperm moving in forward direction is Progressively Motile Non progressively Motile-Those sperms are moving circular motion are Non Progressively Motile Immotile- Those sperms are fail to move or dead sperms.

The total motility reference of 40% can be divided in a 32% of progressive motility and 8% of motility in situ.

Semen samples which have more than 30% progressive motility are considered as normozoospermia. Samples below that value are classified as asthenozoospermia regarding the WHO criteria.

=== Sperm morphology ===
Regarding sperm morphology, the WHO criteria as described in 2021 state that a sample is normal (samples from men whose partners had a pregnancy in the last 12 months) if 4% (or 5th centile) or more of the observed sperm have normal morphology. If the sample has less than 4% of morphologically normal spermatozoa, it's classified as teratozoospermia.

Normal sperm morphology is hard to classify because of lack of objectivity and variations in interpretation, for instance. In order to classify spermatozoa as normal or abnormal, the different parts should be considered. Sperm has a head, a midpiece and a tail.

Firstly, the head should be oval-shaped, smooth and with a regular outline. What is more, the acrosomal region should comprise the 40–70% area of the head, be defined and not contain large vacuoles. The amount of vacuoles should not excess the 20% of the head's area. It should be 4–5 μm long and a width of 2.5–3.5 μm.

Secondly, the midpiece and the neck should be regular, with a maximal width of 1 μm and a length of 7–8 μm. The axis of the midpiece should be aligned with the major axis of the head.

Finally, the tail should be thinner than the midpiece and have a length of 45 μm approximately and a constant diameter along its length. It is important that it is not rolled up.

Since abnormalities are frequently mixed, the teratozoospermia index (TZI) is really helpful. This index is the mean number of abnormalities per abnormal sperm. To calculate it, 200 spermatozoa are counted (this is a good number). From this number, the abnormalities in head, midpiece and tail are counted, as well as the total abnormal spermatozoa. Once that task has been done, the TZI is calculated like this:

TZI= (h+m+t)/x

- x = number of abnormal spermatozoa.
- h = number of spermatozoa with head abnormalities.
- m = number of spermatozoa with midpiece abnormalities.
- t = number of spermatozoa with tail abnormalities.

Another interesting index is the sperm deformity index (SDI), which is calculated the same way as the TZI, but instead of dividing by the number of abnormal spermatozoa, the division is by the total number of spermatozoa counted. The TZI takes values from 1 (only one abnormality per sperm) to 3 (each sperm has the three types of abnormalities).

Morphology is a predictor of success in fertilizing oocytes during in vitro fertilization.

Up to 10% of all spermatozoa have observable defects and as such are disadvantaged in terms of fertilising an oocyte.

Also, sperm cells with tail-tip swelling patterns generally have lower frequency of aneuploidy.

==== Motile sperm organelle morphology examination ====
A motile sperm organelle morphology examination (MSOME) is a particular morphologic investigation wherein an inverted light microscope equipped with high-power optics and enhanced by digital imaging is used to achieve a magnification above x6000, which is much higher than the magnification used habitually by embryologists in spermatozoa selection for intracytoplasmic sperm injection (x200 to x400). A potential finding on MSOME is the presence of sperm vacuoles, which are associated with sperm chromatin immaturity, particularly in the case of large vacuoles.

=== Semen volume ===
According to one lab test manual semen volumes between 2.0 mL and 5 mL are normal; WHO regards 1.4 mL as the lower reference limit. Low volume, called hypospermia, may indicate partial or complete blockage of the seminal vesicles, or that the man was born without seminal vesicles. In clinical practice, a volume of less than 1,4 mL in the setting of infertility is most likely due to incomplete ejaculation or partial loss of sample, asides this, patient should be evaluated for hypoandrogenism and obstructions in some parts of the ejaculatory tract, azoospermia, given that it has been at least 48 hours since the last ejaculation to time of sample collection.

The human ejaculate is mostly composed of water, 96 to 98% of semen is water. One way of ensuring that a man produces more ejaculate is to drink more liquids. Men also produce more seminal fluid after lengthy sexual stimulation and arousal. Reducing the frequency of sex and masturbation helps increase semen volume. Sexually transmitted diseases also affect the production of semen. Men who are infected with the human immunodeficiency virus (HIV) produce lower semen volume.

The volume of semen may also be increased, a condition known as hyperspermia. A volume greater than 6mL may indicate Prostate inflammation. When there's no volume, the condition is named as aspermia, which could be caused by retrograde ejaculation, anatomical or neurological diseases or anti-hypertensive drugs.

=== Appearance ===
Semen normally has a whitish-gray colour. It tends to get a yellowish tint as a man ages. Semen colour is also influenced by the food we eat: foods that are high in sulfur, such as garlic, may result in a man producing yellow semen. Presence of blood in semen (hematospermia) leads to a brownish or red coloured ejaculate. Hematospermia is a rare condition. Brown semen is a result of infection, inflammation, trauma or tumor in the urological components such as the urethra, epididymis and seminal vesicles

Semen that has a deep yellow colour or is greenish in appearance may be due to medication.Other causes of unusual semen colour include sexually transmitted infections such as gonorrhea and chlamydia, genital surgery and injury to the male sex organs.

=== Fructose level ===
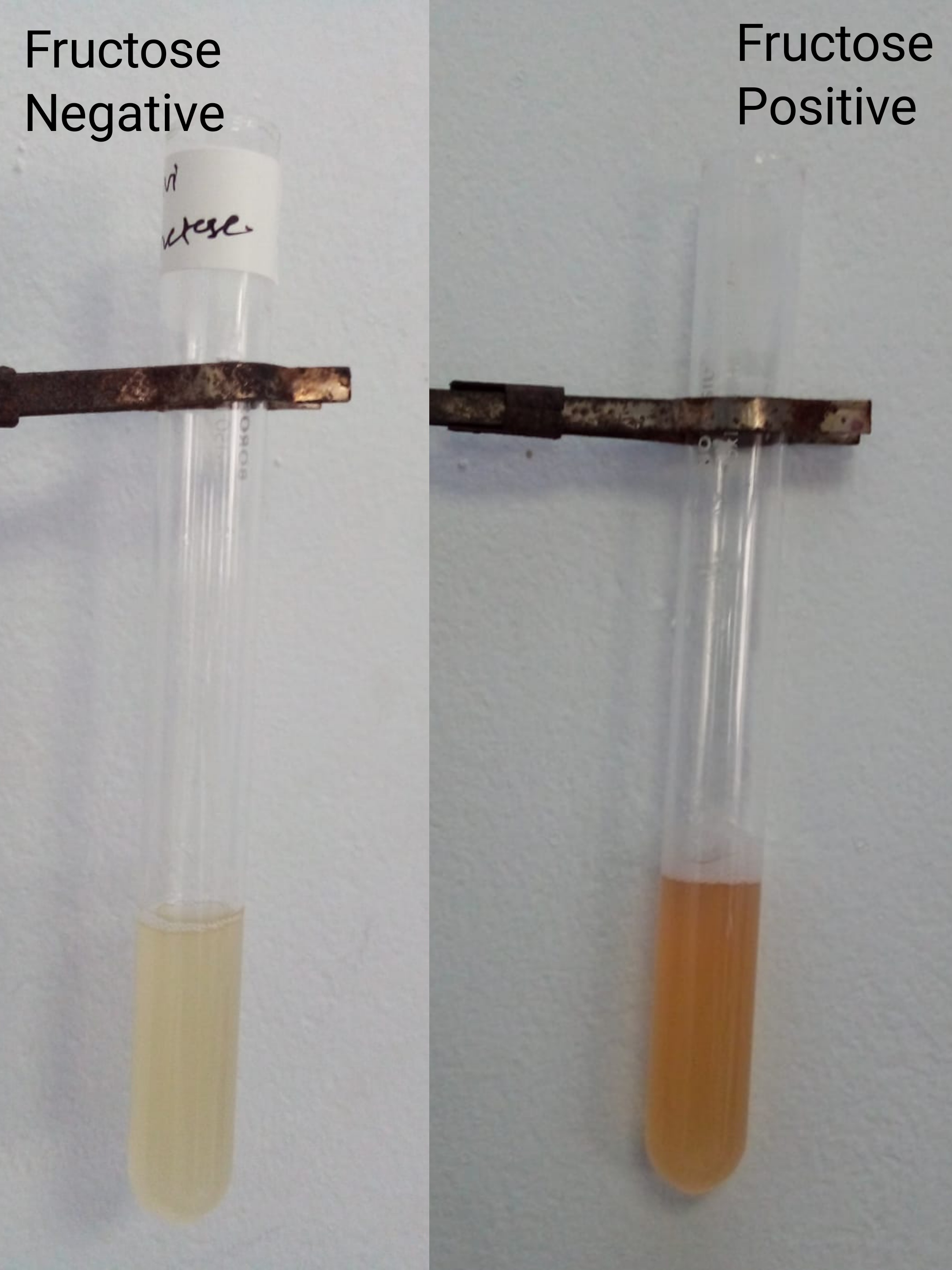
Semen Fructose Test

Fructose level in the semen may be analysed to determine the amount of energy available to the semen for moving. WHO specifies a normal level of 13 μmol per sample. Absence of fructose may indicate a problem with the seminal vesicles. The semen fructose test checks for the presence of fructose in the seminal fluid. Fructose is normally present in the semen, as it is secreted by the seminal vesicles. The absence of fructose indicates ejaculatory duct obstruction or other pathology.

=== pH ===
According to one lab test manual normal pH range is 7.2–8.2; WHO criteria specify normal as 7.2–7.8. Acidic ejaculate (lower pH value) may indicate one or both of the seminal vesicles are blocked. A basic ejaculate (higher pH value) may indicate an infection. A pH value outside of the normal range is harmful to sperm and can affect their ability to penetrate the egg. The final pH results from balance between pH values of accessory glands secretions, alkaline seminal vesicular secretion and acidic prostatic secretions.

=== Liquefaction ===
The liquefaction is the process when the gel formed by proteins from the seminal vesicles and the prostate is broken up and the semen becomes more liquid. It normally takes between 30 minutes and 1 hour for the sample to change from a thick gel into a liquid. In the NICE guidelines, a liquefaction time within 60 minutes is regarded as within normal ranges.

=== Viscosity ===
Semen viscosity can be estimated by gently aspirating the sample into a wide-bore plastic disposable pipette, allowing the semen to drop by gravity and observing the length of any thread. High viscosity can interfere with determination of sperm motility, sperm concentration and other analysis.

=== MOT ===
MOT is a measure of how many million sperm cells per ml are highly motile, that is, approximately of grade a (>25 micrometer per 5 sek. at room temperature) and grade b (>25 micrometer per 25 sek. at room temperature). Thus, it is a combination of sperm count and motility.

With a straw or a vial volume of 0.5 milliliter, the general guideline is that, for intracervical insemination (ICI), straws or vials making a total of 20 million motile spermatozoa in total is recommended. This is equal to 8 straws or vials 0.5 mL with MOT5, or 2 straws or vials of MOT20. For intrauterine insemination (IUI), 1–2 MOT5 straws or vials is regarded sufficient. In WHO terms, it is thus recommended to use approximately 20 million grade a+b sperm in ICI, and 2 million grade a+b in IUI.

=== DNA damage ===
DNA damage in sperm cells that is related to infertility can be probed by analysis of DNA susceptibility to denaturation in response to heat or acid treatment and/or by detection of DNA fragmentation revealed by the presence of double-strand breaks detected by the TUNEL assay. Other techniques performed in order to measure the DNA fragmentation are: SCD (sperm chromatin dispersion test), ISNT (in situ nick translation), SCSA (sperm chromatin structural assay) and comet assay.

=== Total motile spermatozoa ===
Total motile spermatozoa (TMS) or total motile sperm count (TMSC) is a combination of sperm count, motility and volume, measuring how many million sperm cells in an entire ejaculate are motile.

Use of approximately 20 million sperm of motility grade c or d in ICI, and 5 million ones in IUI may be an approximate recommendation.

=== Immunological Testing ===
The sample may also be tested for white blood cells. A high level of white blood cells in semen is called leucospermia and may indicate an infection. Cutoffs may vary, but an example cutoff is over 1 million white blood cells per milliliter of semen.

An important part of semen other than sperm cells is the presence of leukocytes or white blood cells. During normal function, WBCs aid in the reduction of inflammation, are involved in the production of reactive oxidative species (ROS), and aid in the destruction of faulty sperm. When leukocyte production is higher than the normal range, healthy sperm cells will be degraded in excess, creating infertility by a reduced sperm count and sperm clumping visible during microscopic examination. This specific immune response is known as “antisperm antibodies” and can be screened for using an antisperm antibody assay. The increased immune response can be found in blood, vaginal fluid, and semen.

The increased leukocytes in the bodily fluids create an increased production of ROS.. Reactive oxygen species are involved in communication within the cell, intracellular signaling, on many levels, impacting ATP generation, cell movement, and repair. Resulting in sperm impairment on many physiological levels.Issues in immunological response impacting male fertility can be linked to testicular trauma, vasectomy reversal, spinal cord injury, and infection.

== Abnormalities ==
- Aspermia: absence of semen
- Azoospermia: absence of sperm
- Hypospermia: low semen volume
- Hyperspermia: high semen volume
- Oligozoospermia: very low sperm count
- Asthenozoospermia: poor sperm motility
- Teratozoospermia: sperm carry more morphological defects than usual
- Necrozoospermia: all sperm in the ejaculate are dead
- Leucospermia: a high level of white blood cells in semen

== Factors that influence results ==
Apart from the semen quality itself, there are various methodological factors that may influence the results, giving rise to inter-method variation.

Compared to samples obtained from masturbation, semen samples from collection condoms have higher total sperm counts, sperm motility, and percentage of sperm with normal morphology. For this reason, they are believed to give more accurate results when used for semen analysis.

If the results from a man's first sample are subfertile, they must be verified with at least two more analyses. At least two to four weeks must be allowed between each analysis. Results for a single man may have a large amount of natural variation over time, meaning a single sample may not be representative of a man's average semen characteristics. In addition, sperm physiologist Joanna Ellington believes that the stress of producing an ejaculate sample for examination, often in an unfamiliar setting and without any lubrication (most lubricants are somewhat harmful to sperm), may explain why men's first samples often show poor results while later samples show normal results.

A man may prefer to produce his sample at home rather than at the clinic. The site of semen collection does not affect the results of a semen analysis. If produced at home, the sample should be kept as close to body temperature as possible, as exposure to cold or warm conditions can affect sperm motility.

== Measurement methods ==
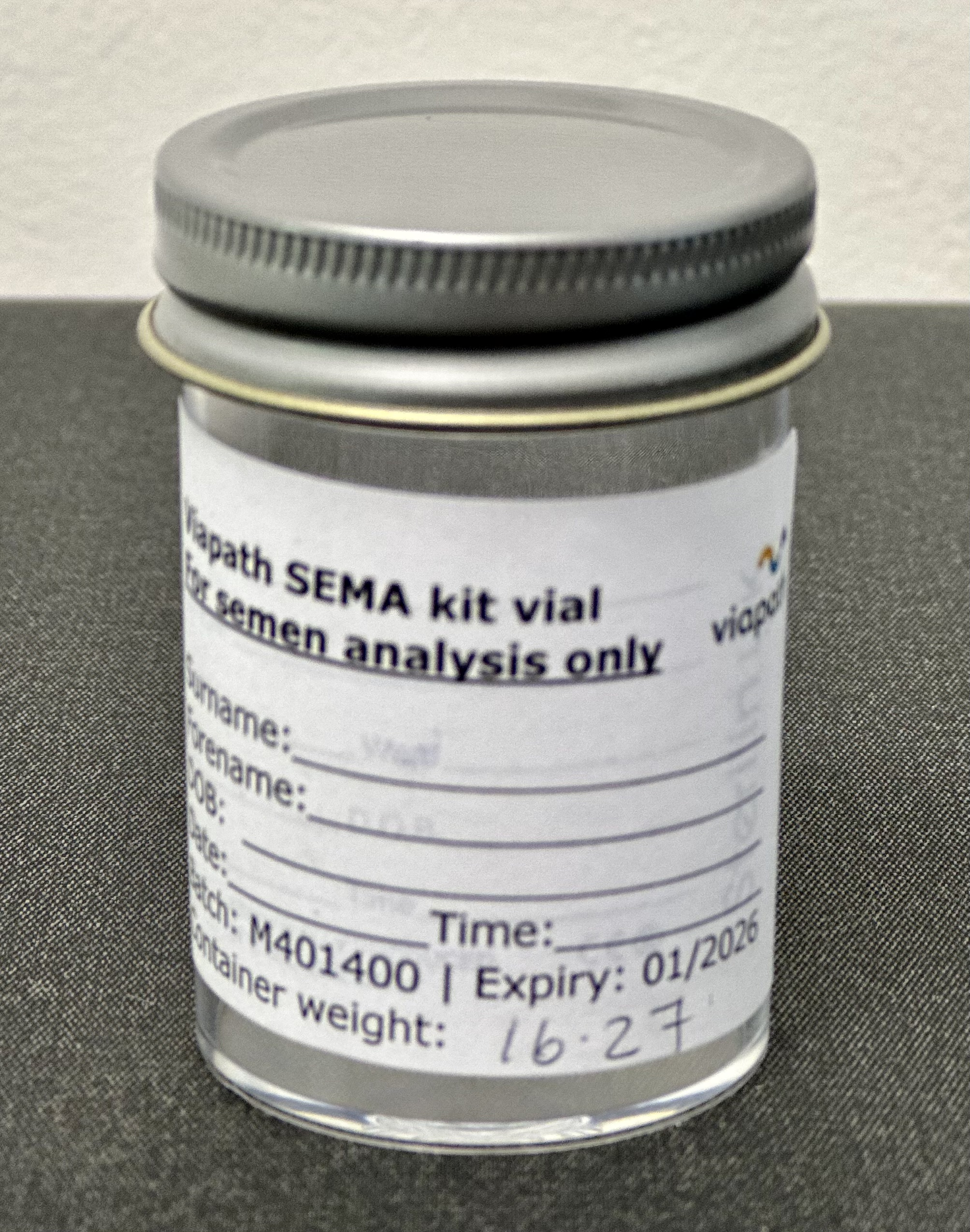
Pre-weighted container for semen analysis

Volume can be determined by measuring the weight of the sample container, knowing the mass of the empty container. Sperm count and morphology can be calculated by microscopy. Sperm count can also be estimated by kits that measure the amount of a sperm-associated protein, and are suitable for home use.

Computer assisted semen analysis (CASA) is a catch-all phrase for automatic or semi-automatic semen analysis techniques. Most systems are based on image analysis, but alternative methods exist such as tracking cell movement on a digitizing tablet. Computer-assisted techniques are most-often used for the assessment of sperm concentration and mobility characteristics, such as velocity and linear velocity. Nowadays, there are CASA systems, based on image analysis and using new techniques, with near perfect results, and doing full analysis in a few seconds. With some techniques, sperm concentration and motility measurements are at least as reliable as current manual methods.

Raman spectroscopy has made progress in its ability to perform characterization, identification and localization of sperm nuclear DNA damage.

Semen Fructose Test has made progress in its ability to perform characterization, identification and localization of sperm nuclear DNA damage.

== See also ==
- Semen quality
- Artificial insemination for more details of how semen parameters affects pregnancy rate
