= Sperm Chromatin Structure Assay =

Sperm Chromatin Structure Assay (SCSA) is a diagnostic approach that detects sperm abnormality with a large extent of DNA fragmentation. First described by Evenson in 1980, the assay is a flow cytometric test that detects the vulnerability of sperm DNA to acid-induced denaturation DNA in situ. SCSA measures sperm DNA fragmentation attributed to intrinsic and extrinsic factors and reports the degree of fragmentation in terms of DNA Fragmentation Index (DFI). The use of SCSA expands from evaluation of male infertility and subfertility, toxicology studies and evaluation of quality of laboratory semen samples. Notably, SCSA outcompetes other convention sperm DNA fragmentation (sDF) assays such as TUNEL and COMET in terms of efficiency, objectivity, and repeatability.

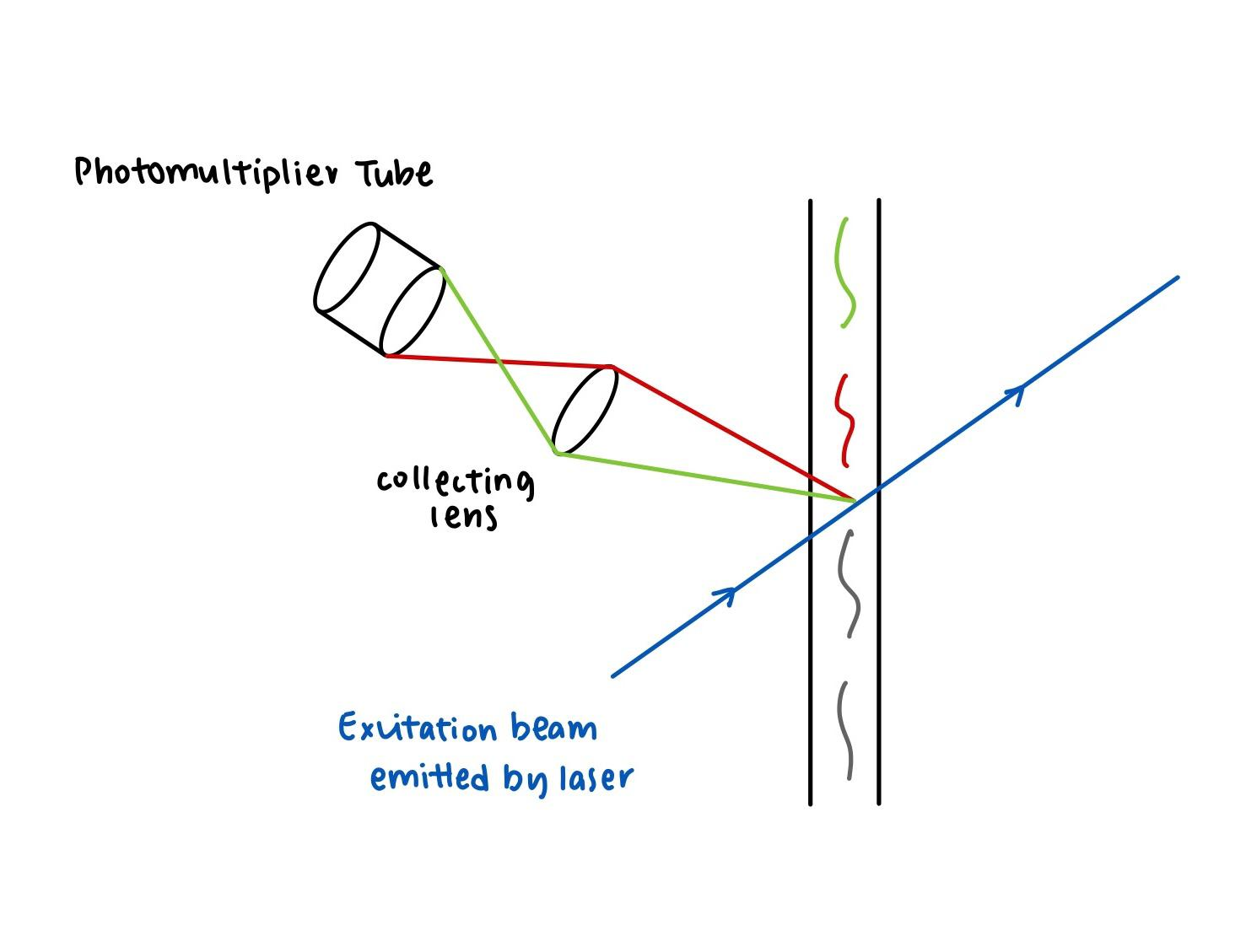
Schematic representation of the SCSA. Use of flow cytometry in differentiating intact sperms from defected sperms. Laser beam strikes each sperm cell. Photomultiplier tube identifies and quantifies the results.

== History ==
Before the development of SCSA, diagnosis or prognosis of male infertility/subfertility was principally referenced the World Health Organisation (WHO) manual-based semen parameters, including semen concentration, motility, and morphology. Yet, several reports of pregnancy failure had the parameters within normal range, suggesting that none of these measurements has drawn a reliable conclusion to reflect chance of fertility of a couple. Furthermore, such parameters are often associated with high labour intensity and lack of statistical power.

In the late 1970s, Donald P. Evenson at Memorial Sloan Kettering Cancer Centre in the United States received an NIH Research Project Grant (RO1) for mammalian sperm chromatin structure study. Various techniques have since been adopted to gain access to sperm DNA integrity. In particular, transmission electron microscopy reflected a significant amount of sperm chromatin heterogeneity.

The heterogeneity was then confirmed through flow cytometry by contrasting AO staining results between human and mouse sperm nuclei. Homogeneous results were observed in the mouse sample while heterogeneous fluorescence intensity varied among the human sample. A hypothesis was proposed "single-stranded/double-stranded DNA breaks-induced sperm DNA fragmentation is correlated to male infertility." In 1980, Evenson et al. published papers that synthesise this knowledge into clinical tests and found SCSA.

Initially, utilization of thermal energy in buffer (100 °C, 5 min) was proposed and used for denaturation of DNA at sites DNA damage. However, the heated sperm protocol was time-consuming and induced random loss of sperm sample. Therefore, acid-induced denaturation has replaced heat-induced denaturation due to greater convenience of low pH technique and similarity in results.

== Principle ==
SCSA is a widespread diagnostic tool in detection of sperm samples with a high degree of DNA fragmentation and absence of histone-to-protamine proteins exchange in sperm nuclei. SCSA defines sperm abnormality as an increased vulnerability of sperm DNA to in-situ heat/acid-induced denaturation. Theoretically, a completely mature and healthy sperm nuclei, which is rich in disulfide bond (S-S), shall have its DNA preserved in double-stranded form. A low pH treatment opens up defective sperm DNA at the sites of damage. Through acridine orange (AO) staining, AO molecules are intercalated into double-stranded DNA in intact sperms while aggregation of AO molecules occurs at single-stranded DNA in defective sperms. Undergoing flow cytometry (blue light), green (native DNA) and red (damaged DNA) fluorescence will be emitted from intact and defective sperms respectively. Signals will be analysed with software programming in examination of both sperm DNA fragmentation (sDF) and atypical chromatin structure.

=== Causes for sperm DNA damage ===
The integrity of sperm DNA is in close correlation with the transfer of paternal DNA into the oocyte during fertilisation. The etiology of sperm DNA damage can be subdivided into intrinsic and extrinsic factors. The former is attributed to a series of pathophysiological phenomena during spermatogenesis; the latter is caused by postnatal exposure to endogenous sources of DNA breaks.

==== Intrinsic factors ====
- Abnormality in recombination and chromatin restructuring: During spermatogenesis, crossing-over of chromatid segments between homologous chromosomes may have occurred abnormally. Specific nucleases are programmed to introduce DNA double-stranded breaks for the progress of crossing-over. To prevent undesirable alterations, DNA damage checkpoint is activated and progress of meiosis will be suspended when DNA is damaged. Incorrect activation or inactivation of the checkpoint is suspected to be the cause of fragmented DNA in ejaculated spermatozoa. However, such a conclusion is theoretically speculative and currently there is no direct confirmation of this hypothesis in humans. During spermiogenesis, DNA double-strand breaks are introduced to relieve torsional stress and to enable the substitution of nucleosome histone cores by transitional proteins. Alteration to such processes may be detrimental to the chromosomal integrity of sperm.
- Abortive apoptosis: Apoptosis refers to a programmed cell death that removes abnormal cells and to prevent their over-proliferation. If apoptosis is not activated efficiently, overpopulation of germ cells or escape of defective germ cells will lead to sperm DNA damage.
- Oxidative stress: Oxidative stress denotes the imbalance of activity between reactive oxygen species (ROS) and endogenous antioxidant agents. High levels of ROS cause DNA damage in terms of single-stranded breaks and double-stranded breaks frequently recorded in infertile men's sperms.

==== Extrinsic factors ====
- Age: Although males produce sperm throughout their adulthood, older age is associated with increased number of DNA double-stranded breaks and decreased frequency of sperm apoptosis. Such observation is implicative of deterioration of sperm selection, quality, and integrity.
- Heat stress: High temperatures cause adverse effects to sperm DNA and male fertility. Excessive heat is related to impaired sperm chromatin integrity, and testis overheating is associated with reduced fertility potential.
- Smoking: Toxins in common tobaccos may increase the prevalence of fragmented DNA. Smoking is associated with significantly escalated levels of seminal ROS and oxidative stress. Increased ROS activity leads to apoptosis and increased fragmentation of DNA.

=== Procedure ===
Currently, only the SCSA protocol developed by Evenson et al. has received trademark protection in achievement of clinical relevance between different laboratories. The individual steps of SCSA are as follows:

1. Freezing/Thawing: After ejaculation, human sperm samples are subjected to a 30-minute semen liquefaction at 37 °C, followed by cryopreservation in an ultra-low temperature freezer (–70 to –110 °C) or placed directly into liquefied nitrogen cryovial. Frozen or fresh sperm samples are thawed in a 37 °C water bath and diluted with a TNE buffer to obtain 200 μL suspension (sperm concentration: 1-2 x 10^6 mL).
2. Acid-induced denaturation: 400 μL acidic solution (pH 1.2) containing 0.15M sodium chloride solution, 0.08M Tris hydrochloric acid, and 0.1% Triton-X 100 are added into 200 μL sperm suspension, and the solution is mixed strictly for 30 seconds. Such a process enables denaturation of sperm nuclei with DNA damage.
3. Acridine orange (AO) staining: Next, 1.20 ml of AO staining solution with 6 μg AO/ml staining buffer is added into the mixture. The small AO molecules penetrate through the sperm chromatin in access to double-stranded DNA and single-stranded DNA in intact and defective sperm nuclei respectively.
4. Flow cytometry (FCM): Using a flow cytometer, 500-1000 sperms can be examined within minutes on a 1024 x 1024 gradation scale through a dual parameter. Visualized under blue light at the wavelengths of 450-490 nm, double-stranded DNA from intact sperms emit green fluorescence (488 nm) while aggregation of AO molecules single-stranded DNA from defective sperms leads to metachromatic shift to red fluorescence (>630 nm).
5. Data analysis: A scattergram (cytogram) will be generated from the flow cytometer reflecting DNA stainability from red (X-axis) and green (Y-axis) dots to single out the heterogeneity; With SCSAsoft® software, data from the scattergram will be converted into frequency histograms in calculation of DNA fragmentation index (DFI) / Cells Outside the Main Peak of αt (COMPαt), alpha t (αt), and High DNA Stainable fraction (HDS).

== Parameters ==
SCSA consists of a fixed flow cytometry protocol and a specific computing program, SCSAsoft ®. Measurements include DNA fragmentation index (DFI) and High DNA Stainable (HDS) fraction, which represent the percentage of sperm with DNA breaks/protamine defects and immature spermatozoa without full protamination respectively.

=== DNA fragmentation index (DFI) ===
Also known as Cells Outside the Main Peak of αt (COMPαt), DFI can be further sub-classified into mean DFI (X DFI) and standard deviation DFI (SD DFI). The index has been determined as the most sensitive criteria for fertility assessment in reflection of sperm DNA integrity. Normal DFI implies no measurable value; moderate DFI sample infers normal sperm morphology; and high DFI fractions exhibited elongated nuclei and signs of apoptosis. In general, the greater the DFI, the higher the chance of infertility or subfecundity.

Within DFI of 0-20%, the occurrence of spontaneous pregnancy remains consistent; when DFI exceeds 20%, the rate of natural fertility gradually declines; when DFI exceeds 30%, the odds ratio for natural or Intrauterine insemination (IUI) fertility is greatly reduced by 8-10 folds, suggesting a close-to-zero chance of pregnancy.

=== High DNA Stainable (HDS) fraction ===
The HDS sperm population has a remarkably high degree of DNA staining by AO molecules due to the presence of unprocessed P2 protamines. Determination of HDS value reflects structural chromatin abnormalities. A high HDS value is indicative of immature sperm morphology and hence pregnancy failure.

== Applications ==
=== Diagnosis of male infertility or subfertility ===
Since the SCSA can be performed to assess the sperm abnormality, it is a valid instrument to determine male infertility or subfertility.

Although the causes and events that actuate sperm DNA damage and fragmentation are not yet fathomed, Sperm DNA fragmentation has been shown to be closely correlated with fertility and subfertility in not only humans, but also bulls, boars, and stallions. Such finding asserts the DFI determined by SCSA to be a strong independent predictor of in vivo pregnancy and a clinically useful technique.

Currently, 25% DFI is the established clinical threshold in classifying males into statistical probability of: 1) increased time for natural pregnancy, 2) lower chance of Intrauterine insemination (IUI) success, 3) more miscarriage, or 4) infertility. High HDS values are in positive correlation to pregnancy failures.

In such cases, other assisted reproductive technologies (ART) may be performed, including intracytoplasmic sperm injection (ICSI) (for sperm sample with DFI>25%) or testicular sperm extraction (TESE) (for sperm sample with DFI>50%).

=== Toxicology studies ===
Sperm DNA damage can be attributed to exposure chemotherapy, radiotherapy, or other environmental toxicants. SCSA is highly dose-responsive to sperm DNA fragmentation induced by chemical toxicants. Therefore, SDαt is the most important variable for toxicology studies.

=== Evaluation of cool-stored semen ===
SCSA is also performed to assess the quality of laboratory sperm samples that have been stored for at least 24 hours. Semen samples that have been stored at appropriate conditions will have essentially no change, while greater change in DNA quality indicates an improper handling.

== Advantages ==
SCSA has numerous advantages when compared to other sperm DNA fragmentation (sDF) assays [TUNEL assay, COMET assay, and Sperm Chromatin Dispersion (SCD)], which include:

- More time and cost efficient: 5000-10000 spermatozoa can be analysed in less than 5 minutes. The efficiency is higher than any other existing sperm fragmentation protocols. Moreover, the requirements for equipment and reagents are relatively low. Only 10 cents are required per test for the reagents required.
- Higher objectivity and accuracy: Conventional sperm analysis includes sperm count, morphology and motility in determination of infertility or subfertility. However, several reports of pregnancy failure had the aforementioned parameters within normal range. For SCSA, machine-guided DFI and HDS values with an unbiased threshold are measured rather than subjective human-eye evaluation, resulting in a higher precision (Coefficient of Variation testing, CV's of 1-3%).
- Higher repeatability: Since sperm count, morphology and motility of semen samples fluctuate within a short period of time, results of analysis are less repeatable. SCSA has a repeatability of 0.98-0.99 in clinical settings. Unless disruption is made by different lifestyles or medical intervention, experimental results are reproducible.

== Limitations ==
Despite the objective data and advantages offered, the efficacy of SCSA in fertility assessment remains doubted clinically. Suggested limitations include:

- Poor association between DFI and reproductive outcomes: Low odd ratios were observed between DFI and fertility outcomes in several meta-analysis. Furthermore, experimental results are mainly obtained as level 3 evidence (from retrospective cohort studies, case-control studies, and meta-analysis of level 3 studies) with reference to the evidence based medicine (EBM), suggesting its low clinical value.
- Unvalidated threshold: The DFI and HDS were established through measuring the vulnerability of sperm DNA to acid-induced denaturation instead of a direct measurement of sperm DNA integrity. AO staining on intact and defected sperms may not represent the degree of sperm fragmentation. Hence, the current threshold may not be accurate in reflecting the actual fertility situation.
