= Asthenozoospermia =

Medical term for reduced sperm motility

-spermia,
Further information: Testicular infertility factors

Aspermia—lack of semen; anejaculation
Asthenozoospermia—sperm motility below lower reference limit
Azoospermia—absence of sperm in the ejaculate
Hyperspermia—semen volume above upper reference limit
Hypospermia—semen volume below lower reference limit
Oligospermia—total sperm count below lower reference limit
Necrospermia—absence of living sperm in the ejaculate
Teratospermia—fraction of normally formed sperm below lower reference limit

Asthenozoospermia (or asthenospermia) is the medical term for reduced sperm motility. Complete asthenozoospermia, that is, 100% immotile spermatozoa in the ejaculate, is reported at a frequency of 1 of 5000 men. Causes of complete asthenozoospermia include metabolic deficiencies, ultrastructural abnormalities of the sperm flagellum (see Primary ciliary dyskinesia) and necrozoospermia.

It decreases the sperm quality and is therefore one of the major causes of infertility or reduced fertility in men. A method to increase the chance of pregnancy is ICSI. The percentage of viable spermatozoa in complete asthenozoospermia varies between 0 and 100%.

== DNA fragmentation ==
Sperm DNA fragmentation level is higher in men with sperm motility defects (asthenozoospermia) than in men with oligozoospermia or teratozoospermia. Among men with asthenozoospermia, 31% were found to have high levels of DNA fragmentation. As reviewed by Wright et al., high levels of DNA fragmentation have been shown to be a robust indicator of male infertility.

== DHA ==
In 2015, Eslamian et al. found a correlation between the composition of the sperm lipid membrane and the odds of having asthenozoospermia. The sperm that have more polyunsaturated fatty acids, such as docosahexaenoic acid (DHA) shown better fertility results. DHA (docosahexaenoic acid) is an acid formed by six double bonds which allows the fluidity of the membrane, necessary for the fusion with the ovule.

Studies in mice have shown that DHA is essential for acrosome reaction and a DHA deficiency results in abnormal sperm morphology, loss of motility and infertility; which can be restored by dietary DHA supplementation.

Furthermore, the supplementation with DHA in humans has been reported to increase sperm motility. But also, DHA supplementation can protect spermatozoa against the damage caused by the cryopreservation process.
