= Aspermia =

Complete lack of semen

- Specialty: Urology

Aspermia is the complete lack of semen with ejaculation (not to be confused with azoospermia, the lack of sperm cells in the semen). It is associated with infertility.

One of the causes of aspermia is retrograde ejaculation, because of that the sperm is kept into the bladder and the final ejaculate is 0 mL. It can be brought on by excessive drug use, or as a result of prostate surgery. It can also be caused by alpha blockers such as tamsulosin and silodosin.

-spermia,
Further information: Testicular infertility factors

Aspermia—lack of semen; anejaculation
Asthenozoospermia—sperm motility below lower reference limit
Azoospermia—absence of sperm in the ejaculate
Hyperspermia—semen volume above upper reference limit
Hypospermia—semen volume below lower reference limit
Oligospermia—total sperm count below lower reference limit
Necrospermia—absence of living sperm in the ejaculate
Teratospermia—fraction of normally formed sperm below lower reference limit

Another cause of aspermia is ejaculatory duct obstruction, which may result in a complete lack or a very low-concentration of semen (oligospermia), in which the semen contains only the secretion of accessory prostate glands downstream to the orifice of the ejaculatory ducts.

Aspermia can be caused by androgen deficiency. This can be the result of absence of puberty, in which the prostate gland and seminal vesicles (which are the main sources of semen) remain small due to lack of androgen exposure and do not produce seminal fluid, or of treatment for prostate cancer, such as maximal androgen blockade.

It is important not to confuse aspermia with azoospermia, which is a pathological condition in which ejaculation occurs but no sperm are found in the semen. In aspermia, spermatozoa are produced, but they cannot be ejaculated. The sperm remain in the urinary bladder, where they die due to the acidic environment of the urine. To prevent this death of the sperm, oral bicarbonate is administered for a while, which bases the urine, so that the sperm are no longer exposed to such a hostile environment and could be collected from the urine to be used in IVF.

== See also ==
- Ejaculatory duct obstruction
- Retrograde ejaculation
