= Ejaculatory duct obstruction =

Blockage of the flow of semen into the urethra

- Specialty: Urology

Ejaculatory duct obstruction (EDO) is a pathological condition which is characterized by the obstruction of one or both ejaculatory ducts. Thus, the efflux of (most constituents of) semen is not possible. It can be congenital or acquired. It is a cause of male infertility and/or pelvic pain. Ejaculatory duct obstruction must not be confused with an obstruction of the vas deferens.

== Cause ==
If both ejaculatory ducts are completely obstructed, affected men will demonstrate male infertility due to aspermia/azoospermia. They will suffer from a very low volume of semen which lacks the gel-like fluid of the seminal vesicles or from no semen at all while they are able to have the sensation of an orgasm during which they will have involuntary contractions of the pelvic musculature. This is contrary to some other forms of anejaculation.

In addition, it is reported to be a cause for pelvic pain, especially shortly after ejaculation. In case of proven fertility but unresolved pelvic pain, even one or both partially obstructed ejaculatory ducts may be the origin of pelvic pain and oligospermia.

Ejaculatory duct obstruction may result in a complete lack of semen (aspermia) or a very low-volume semen (oligospermia) which may contain only the secretion of accessory prostate glands downstream to the orifice of the ejaculatory ducts.

In addition to the congenital form which is often caused by cysts of the Müllerian duct the obstruction can be acquired due to an inflammation caused by chlamydia, prostatitis, tuberculosis of the prostate and other pathogens. In addition, calculus was reported to mechanically block the ejaculatory duct, leading to infertility. However, in many patients, there is no history of an inflammation and the underlying cause simply remains unknown.

== Diagnosis ==
Low-volume, runny/fluid semen (oligospermia) or no semen at all (dry ejaculation/aspermia) are a logical consequence of an obstruction downstream of the seminal vesicles which contribute most to the volume of the semen. Usually, men will be able to observe a runny/fluid, low-volume semen by themselves during masturbation. Since the seminal vesicles contain a viscous, alkaline fluid rich in fructose, a chemical analysis of the semen of affected men will result in a low concentration of fructose and a low pH. A microscopic semen analysis will reveal aspermia/azoospermia.

In contrast, if both vasa deferentia are obstructed (which may be the result of intended sterilization), a semen analysis will also reveal aspermia/azoospermia, but an almost normal volume of the semen, since the efflux of the seminal vesicles is not hindered. This is because approx. 80% of the volume of the semen is the gel-like fluid originating from the seminal vesicles whereas the fraction from the testicles / epididymis, which contains the spermatozoa accounts for only 5–10% of the volume of the semen. In addition, if an obstruction of the vasa deferentia is the cause for the azoospermia, the concentration of fructose in the semen will also be normal, since the fructose comes primarily from the fluid stored in the seminal vesicles. If the seminal-vesicles contain spermatozoa, but the semen does not, the obstruction must be downstream of the seminal vesicles and the ejaculatory ducts are very likely to be obstructed, provided that other causes for a dry ejaculation/aspermia such as a retrograde ejaculation are ruled out.

Attempts are sometimes made to diagnose an ejaculatory duct obstruction by means of medical imaging, e.g. transrectal ultrasound or MRI, or by transrectal needle-aspiration of the seminal vesicles. However, transrectal ultrasound has a relatively low sensitivity of approx. 50% and thus is only a tool to rule-out cysts in the region of the orifices but is not sufficient to rule out an obstruction of the ejaculatory ducts due to other causes. In approx. 50% of cases of unexplained low-volume azoospermia MRI and TRUS do not reveal any pathological findings, because it is difficult to see alterations in a narrowed, scarred duct with these methods. Due to the blockage of ejaculatory ducts, enlarged seminal vesicles are frequently seen in patients with ejaculatory duct obstructions. However, this is again neither a proof of an obstruction nor do normal-sized seminal vesicles rule-out an obstruction of the ejaculatory ducts.

== Treatment ==
A method to treat ejaculatory duct obstruction is transurethral resection of the ejaculatory ducts (TURED). This operative procedure is relatively invasive, has some severe complications, and has led to natural pregnancies of their partners in approximately 20% of affected men. A disadvantage is the destruction of the valves at the openings of the ejaculatory ducts into the urethra such that urine may flow backwards into the seminal vesicles. Another, experimental approach is the recanalization of the ejaculatory ducts by transrectal or transurethral inserted balloon catheter. Though much less invasive and preserving the anatomy of the ejaculatory ducts, this procedure is probably not completely free of complications either and success rates are unknown. There is a clinical study currently ongoing to examine the success rate of recanalization of the ejaculatory ducts by means of balloon dilation.

Usually, affected men have a normal production of spermatozoa in their testicles, so that after spermatozoa were harvested directly from the testes e.g. by TESE, or the seminal vesicles (by needle aspiration) they and their partners are potentially candidates for some treatment options of assisted reproduction e.g. in-vitro fertilisation. Note that in this case, most of the treatment (e.g. ovarian stimulation and transvaginal oocyte retrieval) is transferred to the female partner.

== Prevalence ==
Ejaculatory duct obstruction is the underlying cause for 1–5% of male infertility. Since ejaculatory duct obstruction is a relatively rare cause of infertility, this possibility may be unfamiliar to some physicians, even some urologists.

== See also ==
- Retrograde ejaculation
