= C19orf18 =

Protein-coding gene in humans

Identifiers
- Aliases: C19orf18, chromosome 19 open reading frame 18
- External IDs: MGI: 1920340; GeneCards: C19orf18

Gene location (Human)
Chr.	Chromosome 19 (human)
Band	19q13.43	Start	57,958,437 bp
Band	19q13.43	End	57,974,534 bp

Gene location (Mouse)
Chr.	Chromosome 7 (mouse)
Band	7|7 A1	Start	12,246,444 bp
Band	7|7 A1	End	12,290,250 bp
RNA expression pattern
Bgee	Human / Mouse (ortholog); Top expressed in: gonad; testicle; sperm; apex of heart; tendon of biceps brachii; left testis; right testis; Skeletal muscle tissue of rectus abdominis; left ventricle; right auricle of heart / Top expressed in: spermatid; seminiferous tubule; spermatocyte; gastrula; embryo; lumbar subsegment of spinal cord; medial ganglionic eminence; lumbar spinal ganglion; carotid body; More reference expression data
BioGPS	n/a
Gene ontology
Molecular function	molecular function
Cellular component	membrane; integral component of membrane; extracellular exosome
Biological process	biological process
Sources:Amigo / QuickGO
Orthologs
Databases	NCBI: entry; OMA: entry
Species	Human	Mouse
Entrez	147685	73090
Ensembl	ENSG00000177025	ENSMUSG00000030385
UniProt	Q8NEA5	Q5I0V9
RefSeq (mRNA)	NM_152474	NM_028434
RefSeq (protein)	NP_689687	NP_082710
Location (UCSC)	Chr 19: 57.96 – 57.97 Mb	Chr 7: 12.25 – 12.29 Mb
PubMed search
- Wikidata
View/Edit Human	View/Edit Mouse

Chromosome 19 open reading frame 18 (c19orf18) is a protein which in humans is encoded by the c19orf18 gene. The gene is exclusive to mammals and the protein is predicted to have a transmembrane domain and a coiled coil stretch. This protein has a function that is not yet fully understood by the scientific community.

== Gene ==
Location of c19orf18 on chromosome 19

Aliases of this gene include MGC41906 and LOC147685. The gene is located on chromosome 19 at 19q13.43. The gene spans from 58,485,905 bp to 58,469,805 bp on the minus strand and contains 6 exons and 5 introns. Transcription of this gene produces one spliced mRNA which codes for the protein c19orf18.

=== Expression ===
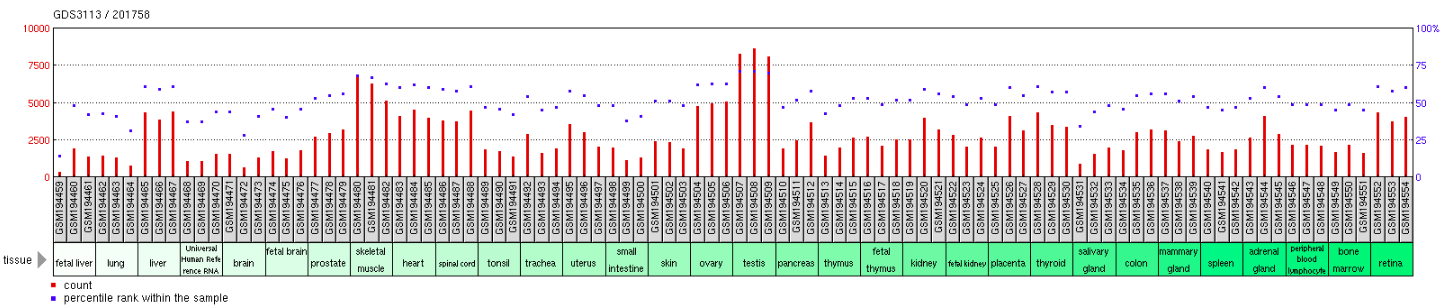
Expression levels of c19orf18 in various human tissues

C19orf18 is ubiquitously expressed at moderate levels. In humans, there is higher expression in the testis, prostate, lung, liver, pancreas, uterus, heart, and other connective tissues.

== Homology ==
=== Paralogs ===
There are no known paralogs of this gene in the human genome.

=== Orthologs ===
The gene is exclusive to mammals. The transmembrane domain is the most conserved region among close orthologs and distant homologs. The following table presents some of the orthologs found using searches in BLAST. This list does not contain all of the orthologs for c19orf18. It is meant to display the diversity of species for which orthologs are found. They are sorted by date of divergence and then protein similarity.

Species	Date of Divergence (MYA)	Accession number	Sequence length (aa)	Identity	Similarity
Homo sapiens (Humans)	0	NP_689687.1	215	100%	100%
Pongo abelii (Orangutan)	15.2	XP_002829939.1	216	92%	94%
Rhinopithecus roxellana (Golden snub-nosed Monkey)	28.1	XP_010385277.1	216	84%	90%
Carlito syrichta (Philippine tarsier)	66.7	XP_008066887.1	217	70%	81%
Otolemur garnettii (Galago)	73	XP_012663984.1	183	50%	62%
Mus musculus (Mouse)	88	XP_017167821.1	183	46%	63%
Oryctolagus cuniculus (European rabbit)	88	XP_008247222.1	242	49%	62%
Rhinolophus sinicus (Horseshoe bat)	94	XP_019567114.1	284	70%	82%
Vicugna pacos (Alpaca)	94	XP_015107013.1	214	65%	80%
Canis lupus familiaris (Dog)	94	XP_005616108.1	223	49%	61%
Bos taurus (Cow)	94	XP_015313970.1	250	44%	53%
Ornithorhynchus anatinus (Platypus)	169	XP_007664656.1	308	34%	57%

== Protein ==
The coding sequence contains 215 amino acids. The molecular weight of c19orf18 is 24.151 kdal and the isoelectric point for the unphosphorylated state is 9.06. The protein sequence is rich in leucine and is deficient in tryptophan, cysteine, and tyrosine. There is a negative charge cluster from amino acid 149 to 172.

=== Structure ===
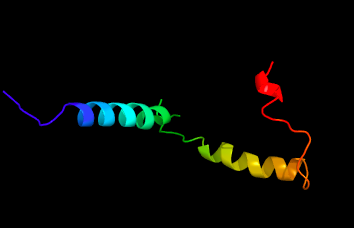
Predicted protein structure of c19orf18

There is a cross-program consensus between GOR4, CFSSP, and PHYRE2 that the protein structure contains mostly coiled regions and alpha helices.

==== Topology ====
The protein sequence is predicted to contain a signal peptide (1 aa to 24 aa), an extracellular domain (25 aa to 100 aa), a transmembrane domain (101 aa to 121 aa), and a cytoplasmic domain (122 aa to 215 aa).

=== Subcellular localization ===
PSORTII and CELLO predicted that the human protein would localize to the plasma membrane and part of it would be in the extracellular region. Immunofluorescent staining of human cell line U-2 OS shows localization to the Golgi apparatus.

=== Function ===
==== Protein interactions ====
C19orf18 protein has been predicted to interact with several proteins listed in the table below. The interactions have been identified and verified through affinity capture-MS.

Predicted interacting protein name	Score	Experimental verification
Nedd4 family interacting protein 1	0.9165	Affinity capture-MS
Activin A receptor, type IIA	0.7829	Affinity capture-MS
Syntaxin 6	0.9679	Affinity capture-MS
Bone morphogenetic protein receptor type 1A	0.8914	Affinity capture-MS
Fibroblast growth factor receptor 2	0.8789	Affinity capture-MS
Microfibrillar-associated protein 3	0.8756	Affinity capture-MS

C19orf18 protein interacts with Nedd4 family interacting protein 1 (NDFIP1) which promotes pancreatic beta cell death reduces insulin secretion. Activin A receptor type 2A (ACVR2A) is a transmembrane receptor that is involved in ligand-binding and mediates the functions of activins. Syntaxin 6 functions in trans-Golgi network vesicle trafficking, perhaps targeting to endosomes in mammalian cells. Bone morphogenetic protein receptor type 1A(BMPR1A) is expressed almost exclusively in skeletal muscle and is a transcriptional regulator. Fibroblast growth factor receptor 2 (FGFR2) plays an essential role in the regulation of osteoblast differentiation, proliferation and apoptosis, and is required for normal skeleton development. Microfibrillar-associated protein 3 (MFAP3) has a function that is not fully understood but may be involved in nuclear signaling and may play a role in metastasis.

=== Clinical significance ===
==== Disease association ====
The c19orf18 protein is down-regulated in pancreatic cancer and contains CpG sites found to be replicated for association with epithelial ovarian cancer risk. The gene also decreases in expression in teratozoospermia and increases in expression in polyendocrine metabolic ovarian syndrome (PMOS). The gene may also be involved in prostate cancer and various tumors
