= CFAP299 =

Protein found in humans

Identifiers
- Aliases: CFAP299, chromosome 4 open reading frame 22, C4orf22, cilia and flagella associated protein 299
- External IDs: MGI: 1916571; GeneCards: CFAP299

Gene location (Human)
Chr.	Chromosome 4 (human)
Band	4q21.21	Start	80,335,730 bp
Band	4q21.21	End	80,963,750 bp

Gene location (Mouse)
Chr.	Chromosome 5 (mouse)
Band	5|5 E3	Start	98,477,163 bp
Band	5|5 E3	End	98,949,906 bp
RNA expression pattern
Bgee	Human / Mouse (ortholog); Top expressed in: bronchial epithelial cell; sperm; buccal mucosa cell; left testis; olfactory zone of nasal mucosa; right uterine tube; right testis; mucosa of paranasal sinus; testicle; gonad / Top expressed in: seminiferous tubule; spermatid; spermatocyte; morula; otolith organ; utricle; embryo; embryo; olfactory epithelium; embryonic organizer; More reference expression data
BioGPS	n/a
Orthologs
Databases	NCBI: entry; OMA: entry
Species	Human	Mouse
Entrez	255119	75784
Ensembl	ENSG00000197826	ENSMUSG00000057816
UniProt	Q6V702	Q810M1
RefSeq (mRNA)	NM_001206997; NM_152770	NM_001024614
RefSeq (protein)	NP_001193926; NP_689983	NP_001019785
Location (UCSC)	Chr 4: 80.34 – 80.96 Mb	Chr 5: 98.48 – 98.95 Mb
PubMed search
- Wikidata
View/Edit Human	View/Edit Mouse

Cilia- and flagella-associated protein 299 (CFAP299) is a protein that in humans is encoded by the CFAP299 gene. CFAP299 is predicted to play a role in spermatogenesis and cell apoptosis.

== Gene ==
=== Location ===
CFAP299 gene is located at chromosome 4, 4q21.21 spanning 642,492 bases from position 80,321,265 to position 80,963,756 on the plus strand. CFAP299 gene is also known as C4orf22, chromosome 4 Open Reading Frame 22 and Uncharacterized Protein C4orf22. CFAP299 gene is located near MRPS25P1 and BMP3 and it has 13 exons.

CFAP299 gene location on chromosome 4

=== Expression ===
CFAP299 is widely expressed in a variety of normal tissue in Homo sapiens . CFAP299 is highly expressed in testis, trachea, lung, fetal lung and epididymis. In terms of health state, CFAP299 has a decreased expression level in glioma, germ cell tumors and chondrosarcoma. An even higher expression of CFAP299 is shown in condition of soft tissue tumor and muscle tissue tumor. CFAP299 is only exist in fetus and adult.

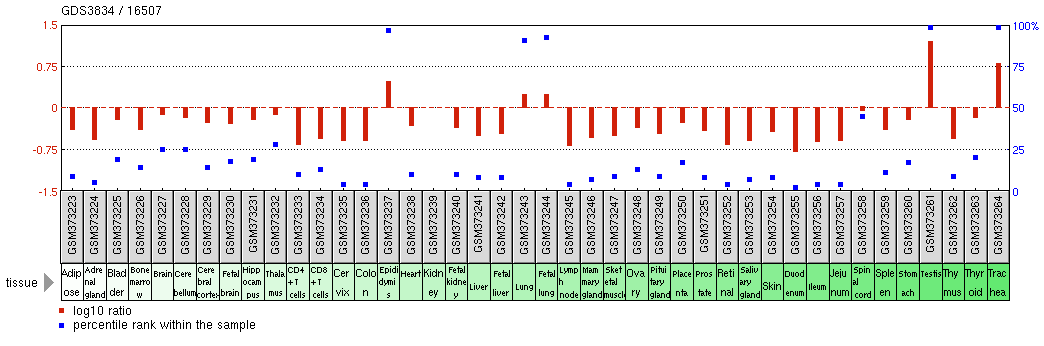
CFAP299 expression in 42 multiple normal tissues in human

=== Promoter ===
The promoter of CFAP299 gene is predicted to present 1000 base pairs upstream of the start of transcription. A variety of transcription factors such as CCAAT binding factors, X-box binding factors and AT rich interactive domain factor bind to promoter to regulate the sequence.

== mRNA ==
=== Splice variants ===
CFAP299 has 9 alternatively spliced variants and 1 unspliced form.

== Protein ==
=== General feature ===
CFAP299 protein contains 233 amino acids in length. The molecular weight of Homo sapiens CFAP299 protein is 26869 Da and the predicted isoelectric point is 5.28. Total number of negatively charged residues is 39 and total number of positively charged residues is 33. Aspartic acid has a higher frequency in CFAP299 protein than in other human proteins.

=== Isoforms ===
CFAP299 protein has two important isoforms. Cilia- and flagella-associated protein 299 isoform 1 is the longest isoform and cilia- and flagella-associated protein 299 isoform 2 is chosen as canonical sequence, which is also the target for this article.

=== Domains ===
There is only one conserved domain DUF4464 from position 13 to position 232 in CFAP299 protein. This domain belongs to DUF4464 family, which is found in eukaryotes and the proteins in this family has a length of 224 to 241 amino acids. This domain is conserved through the orthologs of CFAP299 as indicated by BLAST.

=== Secondary structure ===
CFAP299 proteins secondary structure is dominated by alpha helix and random coil as predicted by GOR4.

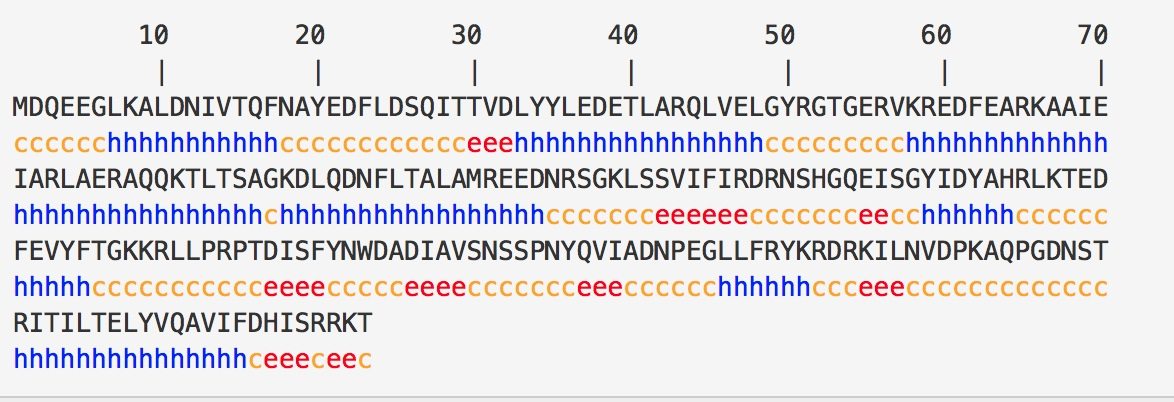
Secondary structure of CFAP299 predicted by GOR4

=== Tertiary structure ===
Tertiary structure of CFAP299 protein predicted by I-TASSER showed that the protein is comprised by alpha helix and coils.

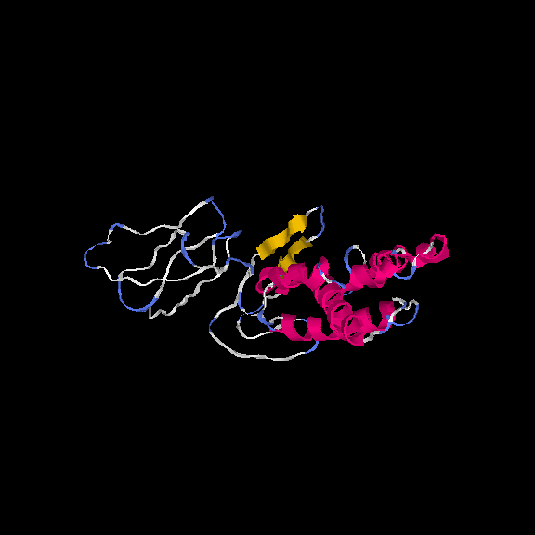
I-TASSER result of tertiary structure of CFAP299 protein

=== Post-translational modifications ===
CFAP299 is predicted to undergo phosphorylation in various site as shown in graph. CFAP299 also predicted to have sumoylation site in position 58, 137 and 232 and two SUMO-interaction Motifs in position 45-49 and 212–216.

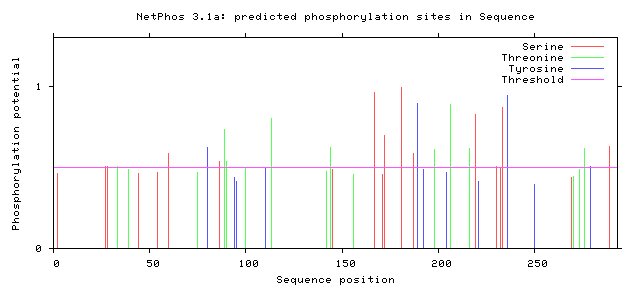
CFAP299 phosphorylation site predicted by Netphos

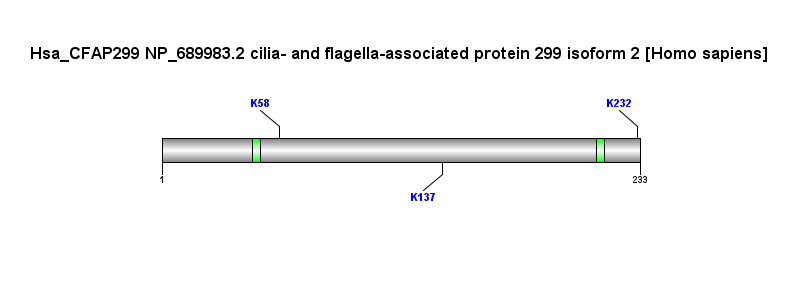
Sumoylation site and Sumoylation interaction motifs of CFAP299 protein

=== Subcellular localization ===
CFAP299 protein is targeted to cytoplasm.

=== Interacting proteins ===
CFAP299 protein is believed to interact with amyloid beta (A4) precursor protein (APP) and BCL2-associated athanogene 3 (BCL2).

== Evolution ==
=== OrthologS ===
CFAP299 protein orthologs exists in mammals, reptiles, birds, amphibians, fish, sponges, sea urchins, insects, fungi and plants. Its most distant relative appear in plants. The table below shows orthologs found by BLAST.

Genus and species	Common name	Taxonomic Group	Date of divergence	accession number	sequence length	sequence identity	sequence similarity
Homo Sapiens	Human	Mammalia	0	NP_689983.2	233	100%	100%
Ochotona princeps	American pika	Lagomorpha	88	XP_004590671.1	233	85%	93%
Mus musculus	House mouse	Rodentia	88	NP_001019785	233	85%	91%
Eumetopias jubatus	Steller sea lion	Carnivora	94	XP_027980031	233	86%	93%
Erinaceus europaeus	European hedgehog	Soricomorpha	94	XP_007518562	233	83%	93%
Ornithorhynchus anatinus	platypus	Monotremata	169	XP_007659769	164	74%	88%
Pogona vitticeps	Central bearded dragon	Reptilia	320	XP_020658829	236	72%	85%
Anolis carolinensis	Green anole	Reptilia	320	XP_008118093	193	71%	85%
Dromaius novaehollandiae	Emu	Aves	320	XP_025959155	226	64%	81%
Anas platyrhynchos	Mallard	Aves	320	XP_027312784.1	243	58%	75%
Xenopus laevis	African clawed frog	Amphibia	353	NP_001088722	233	73%	89%
Nanorana parkeri	Xizang Plateau frog	Amphibia	353	XP_018414504.1	233	73%	88%
Danio rerio	Zebrafish	Actinopterygii	432	NP_001108596	239	60%	77%
Callorhinchus milii	Australian ghostshark	Chondrichthyes	465	XP_007895157	235	68%	82%
Strongylocentrotus purpuratus	Pacific purple sea urchin	Echinoidea	627	XP_011663002	236	66%	80%
Nematostella vectensis	Starlet sea anemone	Anthozoa	685	XP_001619741.1	199	61%	70%
Drosophila melanogaster	Fruit fly	Insecta	794	NP_650260.1	233	31%	46%
Amphimedon queenslandica	Sponge	Demospongiae	951.8	XP_003382446	235	64%	80%
Batrachochytrium dendrobatidis	Chytridiomycetes	Amphibian chytrid fungus	1150	XP_006681372	238	61%	78%
Physcomitrella patens	Spreading earthmoss	Bryopsida	1624	XP_024379106	255	50%	65%

=== Paralog ===
There are no paralogs for CFAP299.

== Clinical significance ==
CFAP299 expression is lowered in people with teratozoospermia, a condition that causes abnormal morphology of sperm and decreased fertility.

In airway epithelial cells that had excessive mucous secretion, a condition that simulated chronic lung disease, CFAP299 showed a reduced expression.
