= Oligoasthenozoospermia =

Oligoasthenozoospermia is a combination of:

- Asthenozoospermia (reduced sperm motility) and
- Oligozoospermia (low spermatozoon count)
