= Cytosolic ciliogenesis =

Process of cell-component formation

Cytosolic ciliogenesis, otherwise cytoplasmic ciliogenesis, is a type of ciliogenesis where the cilium axoneme is formed in the cytoplasm or becomes exposed to the cytoplasm.

Cytosolic ciliogenesis is divided into three types: Primary cytosolic cilia are formed by exposing the axoneme of compartmentalized cilium (formed initially by compartmentalized ciliogenesis) to the cytoplasm. This type of cilia is found in the sperm of human and other mammals. Secondary cytosolic cilia are formed in parallels to the formation of the typical compartmentalized cilium. One end of the axoneme is exposed to the cytoplasm as the other end of the axoneme is formed as compartmentalized cilia. This type of cilia is found in insects. Tertiary cytosolic cilia are axonemes that form directly in the cytoplasm. This type of cilia is found in Plasmodium (the malaria parasite).

== History ==
The term Cytosolic Ciliogenesis was coined in 2004 as part of a study that identified a large set of ciliogenesis genes.

It was found that a subset of genes that are thought to be essential for compartmentalized cilia are not essential to form the sperm flagellum. Since the axoneme of this flagellum was exposed to the cytoplasm it was named Cytosolic Ciliogenesis.
