= Hypospermia =

Condition in which a male has abnormally low semen volume

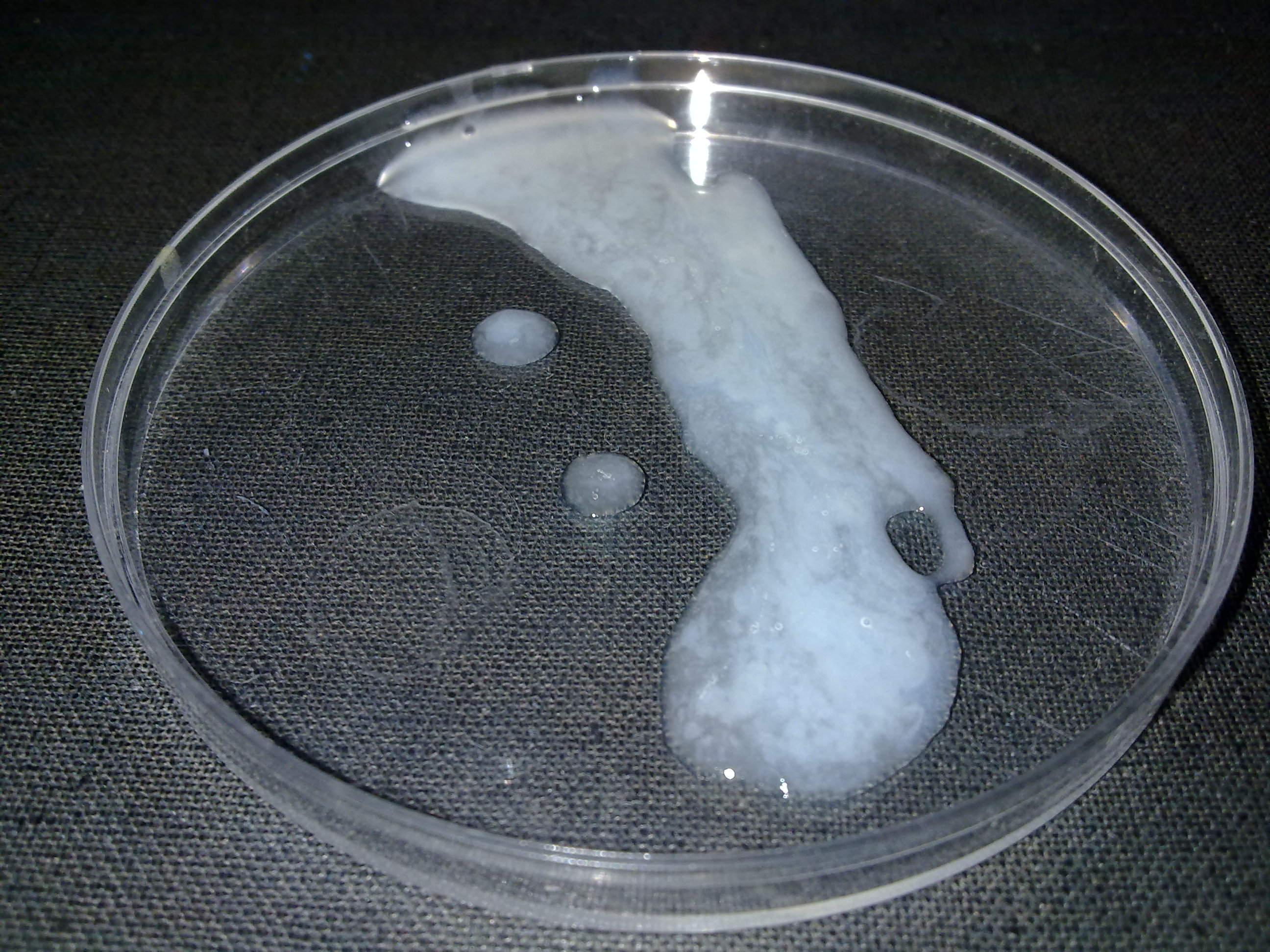
Human semen in a petri dish

Hypospermia is a condition in which a man has an unusually low ejaculate (or semen) volume, less than 1.5 mL. It is the opposite of hyperspermia, which is a semen volume of more than 5.5 mL. It should not be confused with oligospermia, which means low sperm count. Normal ejaculate when a man is not drained from prior sex and is suitably aroused is around 1.5–6 mL, although this varies greatly with mood, physical condition, and sexual activity. Of this, around 1% by volume is sperm cells. The U.S.-based National Institutes of Health defines hypospermia as a semen volume lower than 2 mL on at least two semen analyses.

The presence of high levels of fructose (a sugar) is normal in the semen and originates almost entirely from the seminal vesicles. The seminal vesicles, which are major contributors to ejaculate volume, render semen viscous with a pH of 7.2–7.8. An acidic seminal pH (pH < 7.2) suggests damage to the seminal vesicles and an alkaline seminal pH (pH > 8) suggests prostatic involvement. In addition, low fructose may indicate problems in the prostate, while low semen pH may indicate problems related to the [seminal vesicles]. Obstruction of the seminal vesicles results in low semen volumes since they normally produce 70% of the seminal plasma.

== Signs and symptoms ==
The most common sign of hypospermia is a low volume of semen during ejaculation. The diagnosis is confirmed when one has a semen volume of less than 2.0 mL on at least two successive spermograms. If hypospermia is caused by retrograde ejaculation, sign include cloudy urine after orgasm. There may not be any symptoms of hypospermia unless it is caused by an abnormality.

== Causes ==
Even though there are numerous causes for hypospermia, all of the known contributing factors can be placed into two major distinct categories:

=== Dysfunction of ejaculatory reflex ===
- Ejaculatory dysfunction is when a male is unable to ejaculate properly at the time of sexual climax. Ejaculatory reflex dysfunction is one of the leading causes in male infertility.
- Some conditions in which ejaculatory reflex dysfunction is observed is multiple sclerosis, diabetic neuropathy, spinal cord injuries, or side effects of certain medications.

Examples of dysfunction of ejaculatory reflex include:

==== Retrograde ejaculation ====
- This means that the sperm is produced in the testes but on its way out, it gets misdirected into the bladder rather than coming out through the urethra. This can lead to a low volume of semen (hypospermia) or no semen production (aspermia). Structural or functional damage to the bladder neck muscle causes the backflow of semen during the ejaculation. Nerve damage caused by medical conditions such as diabetes or multiple sclerosis can affect the function of bladder neck muscle. Also, surgery or trauma along with the medications used for hypertension and benign prostatic hyperplasia can contribute to bladder neck problems. Retrograde ejaculation can be diagnosed by the presence of sperm in the urine.

=== Anatomical defects ===
- Anatomical or functional defects of the seminal tract may cause flow obstruction of seminal pathways. This can be observed in people with genetic mutations (specifically the CFTR gene) or ejaculatory duct obstruction(s) such as prostate or seminal vesicle cysts.
- Mutations of the CFTR gene on chromosome 7 can cause an overproduction of thick, sticky mucus in organs with mucous glands, contribute to infertility through clogging the spermatic duct with mucus, and cause congenital bilateral absence of the vas deferens.

Examples of anatomical defects include:

==== Congenital absence of vas deferens and seminal vesicle ====
- In the male reproductive system, there are structures such as vas deferens and seminal vesicles which play an important role in transportation and production of semen or ejaculate. Abnormalities or absence of these structures can lead to low volume of semen and infertility in males. This condition can also be caused by the mutation in the cystic fibrosis transmembrane conductance regulator (CFTR) gene which encodes for chloride channel protein.

==== Blockage of the ejaculatory duct ====
- This is a condition that is caused by obstruction of either one or both ejaculatory ducts leading to hypospermia. The etiology of ejaculatory duct obstruction can be congenital or acquired. The presence of a prostatic cysts, ejaculatory duct stones, or post surgical inflammation of the duct can block the normal flow of semen through the reproductive tract.

==== Hypogonadism ====
- Insufficient or low levels of testosterone in the body can affect the proper functioning of the male reproductive structures and thus lead to decreased secretions or hypospermia. Long-term exposure to drugs with anti-androgen properties (e.g. spironolactone) can also lead to infertility or low volume of semen. Testosterone is produced by the testes and can be used to diagnose hypogonadism.

=== Drugs ===
Drugs can have various types of impact on the male body, side effects of medications may affect male fertility, spermatogenesis, and sexual function. Drugs can affect sperm parameters by inhibiting normal exocrine functions of the testes which can lead to a decrease in production of sperm, or by creating hormone imbalances. For an example, anti-androgenic drugs like spironolactone, cimetidine, and ketoconazole can disrupt androgens in the glands and seminal tract to cause a decrease in production of semen volume. Furthermore, common drugs (e.g. tamsulosin) used to treat hypertension and benign prostatic hyperplasia (increased size of prostate) are attracted to dopamine and serotonin receptors in the brain to cause a decrease in sperm volume through a mechanism that remains unknown.

Certain medications in the following classes of drugs may affect spermatogenesis or sperm parameters*:

- Immunosuppressants
- Non-steroidal anti-inflammatory drugs (NSAIDs) and salicylates
- Inhibitors of thyrosine kinases
- Opiates
- Treatment for benign prostatic hyperplasia
- Hormonal treatments and antiadrenergic drugs
- Antibiotics, antifungals, antiparasites, antivirals, and antimalarials
- Antidepressants
- Anti-gastroesophageal reflux drugs
- Anti-epileptic drugs
- Antihypertensive drugs

Certain medications in the following classes of drugs may affect male sexual libido or sexual function**:

- Immunomodulators
- Inhibitors of protein kinases
- Opioids
- Analgesics
- Treatment of benign prostatic hyperplasia
- Antiadrenergic drugs
- Hormonal treatments
- Diuretics
- Antiretroviral therapy
- Antihistamines
- Antidepressants

*"For most of the drugs that are likely to affect spermatogenesis and/or sperm parameters, the levels of scientific evidence are still insufficient (with the exception of Sirolimus, Sulfasalazine, exogenous testosterone, Finasteride and Cyproterone acetate, for which the levels of evidence are higher). In some cases, data in men do not even exist, and the toxicity of a drug for the male reproductive organs is determined solely on the basis of animal models."

**"For a certain number of pharmaceutical molecules that are likely to affect the sexual function of men being treated, the actual imputability of the drug is often difficult to pinpoint owing to the effect of the illness itself on sexuality (cardiovascular disease and erectile dysfunction; depressive illness and loss of desire, etc.)"

Furthermore, hyperthyroidism, an excess of thyroid hormones, has been associated with reduced semen volume, reduced sperm density, motility, and morphology. Studies in humans show that an excess of circulating thyroid hormones during thyrotoxicosis results in asthenozoospermia, oligozoospermia, and teratozoospermia. These abnormalities frequently associate with semen alterations like reduced semen volume.

== Lifestyle factors ==
=== Alcohol use ===
Lifestyle factors, such as substance use or adiposity, can play a detrimental role in the quality of the semen. One study examining the consequences of alcohol consumption and its effect on semen quality concluded that alcohol intake can lead to a negative effect on semen volume in daily alcohol consumers. However, occasional or moderate use of alcohol was observed to not have an adverse effect on the semen.

=== Body mass index (BMI) ===
A body mass index (BMI) level not within normal range can also affect semen quality negatively. Being underweight, presented by a low BMI value, was observed in an analysis to decrease the total sperm count and semen volume. No significant changes were observed in sperm concentration and motility due to a low BMI. However, due to the lack of raw data, further research is needed to clarify the role of BMI in semen quality. On the other hand, an overweight (BMI of 25.9–29.9) or obese status (BMI over 30) is similarly associated with low semen quality through a decrease of semen volume, concentration, motility, count, and morphology. Alteration of sex hormone levels were also concluded to result from a high BMI status, with affected hormones such as inhibin B or testosterone observed to decrease in concentration, whereas estradiol was increased. The reduction in hormone levels can subsequently result in being diagnosed with hypogonadism.

=== Trace minerals ===
An inadequate level of essential trace minerals in the body can further compromise semen quality. A significantly lower zinc plasma concentration value within the semen was observed in infertile males. Supplementation with zinc could benefit sperm quality by increasing the semen volume and improving sperm motility and morphology. Notably, no significant effects on sperm concentration, count, or sperm viability have been conclusively observed. The likely benefits of zinc in the semen stem from its multifaceted contributions to the stability of the membranes and sperm chromatin. In addition to zinc, nutritional deficiencies or excess intake of selenium is also associated with impaired semen quality. However, in moderate levels, the antioxidant properties of selenium, likely due to an increase in glutathione peroxidase-1 activity (enzyme protecting from oxidative damage) and reduction of reactive oxygen species (ROS) production, may be recommended for supplementation.

=== Dietary pattern ===
In general, a healthy dietary pattern is encouraged, and food modifications may be useful in promoting sperm quality. Some studies have concluded that intake of antioxidants is associated with better sperm parameters as high concentrations of reactive oxygen species can negatively affect the sperm. Consumption of an adequate portion of vegetables and fruits, dietary fibers, omega-3, poultry, and low-fat dairy products may help to lessen risk of male infertility. On the other hand, diets that have been negatively associated with male infertility include high intake of potatoes, soy foods, coffee, alcohol, and sweetened beverages. According to a review, higher consumers of cola showed a statistically significant decrease in semen volume. The high starch levels in potatoes promotes oxidative stress along with risk of inflammation from a resulting high glycemic index. Meanwhile, processed meats can possibly contain xenoestrogens and may compromise semen quality. However, additional research is warranted prior to recommending a set dietary regimen in regard to improving sperm parameters. Currently, the only general recommendation that can be made is to adhere to a healthy dietary pattern such as the DASH diet or Mediterranean diet.

As low density of the sperm population is usually associated with infertility, hypospermia becomes an infertility issue when one is also identified to have oligospermia. Further semen analysis may be needed prior to being identified as oligospermic. When a semen analysis does indicate abnormal results, lifestyle factors recommendations prior to a new semen sample include a nutritional diet, as well as limitations on smoking and alcohol use. A cold bath and removal of tight-fitted underwear apparel may also be recommended within the month prior to re-examination.

== Etiological testing ==
=== Ultrasound imaging ===
Imaging the urogenital system via an ultrasound is the first-line imaging test for hypospermia. This assessment looks out for testicular degeneration, testicular anomalies, and carry out a detailed study of the deep genital tract and glands using a high endorectal probe frequency. This examination makes it possible to visualize the vas deferens over their pelvic path and therefore to diagnose possible agenesis (absence of cells within organs) on portions not accessible to clinical examination.

=== Seminal chemistry ===
Seminal chemistry is a second-line examination needed in the event of suspicion of abnormalities of the excretory genital tract. This examination consists of measuring biochemical markers of the prostate, seminal vesicles and epididymis and seminal plasma, which can indicate the level of damage in these areas and help locate the level of lesions in the cases of hypospermia. The biochemical markers that are measured are alpha-glucosidase (in the epididymis), fructose (in the seminal vesicles) and zinc, citric acid and/or acid phosphatase (for the prostate). The levels of these biological markers are lowered in a variable manner depending on the level of damage to the genital tract.

=== CTFR screening ===
Depending on the severity of the hypospermia (volume ≤ 1 mL) a molecular study of the CFTR gene may be performed. This is done by a molecular "screening" method (high performance liquid chromatography under denaturing conditions (D-HPLC) followed by sequencing of the exons of interest, allowing to detect nearly 95% of mutations in this gene, and even discover new mutations. After this molecular screening step, if variants of the CFTR gene are detected, the geneticist will use computer databases to distinguish whether this nucleotide variant corresponds to a polymorphism of the CFTR gene (without consequence on the function of the CFTR protein) or to a real mutation.

=== Semen analysis ===
A common route to diagnosis for hypospermia that may be requested for is a semen analysis. To obtain the most fresh specimen collection, a semen sample is obtained through the process of masturbation in the setting of a laboratory. An abstinence period of 3–5 days is recommended prior to collection of samples. If a semen analysis cannot be completed, an alternative route to collecting a semen is through coitus interruptus into a bottle. Normally, a typical specimen displays coagulation after ejaculation due to the presence of enzymes within the seminal vesicle, followed by liquification in approximately 30 minutes.

=== Urine collection ===
Furthermore, when the semen volume is low, less than 1 ml, a urine specimen should be collected immediately after masturbation to search for sperm in the urine. Two days before the urine sample is collected, one is required to drink an alkalinized water to allow the sperm cells to survive. After this preliminary preparation step, urine collection is done in a fractional way: the first milliliters of urine are collected and analyzed in isolation through centrifugation and examination under a microscope. The presence of substantial sperm in the post-ejaculatory urine specimen confirms the diagnosis of partial retrograde ejaculation, a dysfunction of the ejaculatory reflex and a known cause of hypospermia.

Unfortunately, even after thorough etiological assessments, an assessor many come to the conclusion of no known etiological cause to explain one's diagnosis of hypospermia. The significance of these idiopathic hypospermia cases are currently unknown and requires more research in the future.

== Treatment ==
Although there are no existing medications on the market for the treatment of hypospermia, some medications and herbal medications have off label uses which can aid in the treatment of this condition and should be considered as soon as possible. According to a review, the use of maca has shown to improve semen volume through an unclear mechanism. In addition, some classes of medications that have been studied include both antidepressants and vessel dilators. Use of pharmacological therapy is uncommon thus individual must rely on psychosexual therapy. Psychosexual therapy addresses issues focused on sexual skills/techniques, self esteem, performance anxiety and interpersonal conflict. Furthermore, according to a review, longer abstinences from sexual intercourse has been associated with increases in sperm count and semen volume.

According to a review, the management for hypospermia will depend upon the etiology of the disease. Studies have shown that functional retrograde ejaculation can be treated with oral pharmacotherapy such as imipramine and pseudoephedrine which can prevent the backflow of semen and stimulate ejaculation. In the case of structural retrograde ejaculation, pharmacotherapy might not work but surgical procedures can fix the bladder neck problem.

The blockage of the ejaculatory duct can be treated via transurethral resection of the ejaculatory duct (TURED) and is indicated for people with low sperm volume. TURED has been shown to improve the volume of semen in men with ejaculatory duct obstruction leading to significant improvement in the fertility rate.

Hormonal abnormalities caused by either primary or secondary hypogonadism can be treated with off-label use of oral clomiphene citrate which has been shown to increases the level of testosterone in the body. Administration of exogenous testosterone for the treatment of hypogonadism has shown to a have negative impact on the process of spermatogenesis.

Abnormalities in the seminal vesicle and vas deferens usually don't respond well to surgeries or medications. In such situations, sperm can be extracted along with assisted reproductive technologies (ARTs) such as intrauterine insemination (IUI), in vitro fertilization (IVF), and intracytoplasmic sperm injection (ICSI) for successful conception. These procedures can be very costly.

== Prevention ==
A study was done to compare the sperm outcomes of individuals with or without infection of the human papilloma virus (HPV), which currently affects 79 million Americans. The study concluded that individuals who had not been infected with HPV had higher rates of sperm motility, functionality, and concentration of sperm. This study suggests that individuals who do not contract HPV or who are vaccinated against HPV have better fertility outcomes than those who are not vaccinated or who have contracted HPV. Vaccination against HPV with Gardasil9 can be administered by hospitals, clinics or most pharmacies in 3 doses ideally at age 11–12 in both girl and boys, but can be taken up to age 45 per Center of Disease Control (CDC) guidelines.

== See also ==
- Aspermia
