= Retrograde ejaculation =

Redirection of ejaculated semen into the urinary bladder

- Anatomy of the human male reproductive system
- Specialty: Urology

Retrograde ejaculation is a male genital disorder that occurs when semen which would be ejaculated via the urethra is redirected to the urinary bladder. Normally, the sphincter of the bladder contracts before ejaculation, inhibiting urination and preventing a reflux of semen into the bladder. The semen is forced to exit via the urethra, the path of least resistance. When the bladder sphincter does not function properly, retrograde ejaculation may occur. It can also be induced deliberately as a primitive form of male birth control (known as coitus saxonicus) or as part of certain alternative medicine practices. The retrograde-ejaculated semen is excreted from the bladder during the next urination.

== Signs and symptoms ==
Retrograde ejaculation is sometimes referred to as a "dry orgasm." A man may notice that no semen is produced during masturbation despite the occurrence of orgasm. Another underlying cause for this phenomenon may be ejaculatory duct obstruction.

During a male orgasm, sperm are released from the epididymides and travel via small tubes called the vasa deferentia. The sperm mix with seminal fluid in the seminal vesicles, prostate fluid from the prostate gland, and lubricants from the bulbourethral gland. During climax, muscles at the end of the bladder neck tighten to prevent retrograde flow of semen. In retrograde ejaculation, these bladder neck muscles are either very weak or the nerves controlling the muscles have been damaged.

== Causes ==
A malfunctioning bladder sphincter, leading to retrograde ejaculation, may be a result either of:

- Autonomic nervous system dysfunction. (Dysautonomia)
- Operation on the prostate. It is a common complication of transurethral resection of the prostate, a procedure in which prostate tissue is removed, slice by slice, through a resectoscope passed along the urethra.

It can also be caused by a retroperitoneal lymph node dissection for testicular cancer if nerve pathways to the bladder sphincter are damaged, with the resulting retrograde ejaculation being either temporary or permanent. Modern nerve-sparing techniques seek to reduce this risk; however, it may also occur as the result of Green Light Laser prostate surgery. Surgery on the bladder neck accounted for about ten percent of the cases of retrograde ejaculation or anejaculation reported in a literature review.

Retrograde ejaculation is a common side effect of medications, such as tamsulosin, that are used to relax the muscles of the urinary tract, treating conditions such as benign prostatic hyperplasia. By relaxing the bladder sphincter muscle, the likelihood of retrograde ejaculation is increased.

The medications that mostly cause it are antidepressant and antipsychotic medication, as well as NRIs such as atomoxetine; patients experiencing this phenomenon tend to quit the medications.

Retrograde ejaculation can also be a complication of diabetes, especially in cases of diabetics with long term poor blood sugar control. This is due to neuropathy of the bladder sphincter. Post-pubertal males (aged 17 to 20 years) who experience repeated episodes of retrograde ejaculation are often diagnosed with urethral stricture disease shortly after the initial complaint arises. It is currently not known whether a congenital malformation of the bulbous urethra is responsible, or if pressure applied to the base of the penis or perineum immediately preceding ejaculatory inevitability may have inadvertently damaged the urethra. This damage is most often seen within 0.5 cm of the ejaculatory duct (usually distal to the duct).

=== Conditions which can affect bladder neck muscle ===
Medications to treat high blood pressure, benign prostate hyperplasia, mood disorders, surgery on the prostate and nerve injury (which may occur in multiple sclerosis, spinal cord injury or diabetes).

== Diagnosis ==
Diagnosis is usually determined after a medical professional performs a urinalysis on a urine specimen that is obtained shortly after ejaculation. In cases of retrograde ejaculation, the specimen will contain an abnormal level of sperm. Especially in case of orgasmic anejaculation, anejaculation can often be confused with retrograde ejaculation, and they share some fundamental aspects of the cause. Urinalysis is used to distinguish between them.

=== Tests ===
The genitals are physically examined to ensure that there are no anatomical problems. The urine will be tested for the presence of semen. If there are no sperm in the urine, it may be due to damage to the prostate as a result of surgery or prior radiation therapy.

== Treatments ==
The treatment depends on the cause. Medications may work for retrograde ejaculation but only in a few cases. Surgery rarely is the first option for retrograde ejaculation and the results have proven to be inconsistent. Medications do not help retrograde ejaculation if there has been permanent damage to the prostate or the testes from radiation. Medications also do not help if prostate surgery has resulted in damage to the muscles or nerves. Medications only work if there has been mild nerve damage caused by diabetes, multiple sclerosis, or mild spinal cord injury.

=== Medications ===
- Tricyclic antidepressants like imipramine.
- Antihistamines like chlorphenamine.
- Decongestants like ephedrine and phenylephrine.

These medications tighten the bladder neck muscles and prevent semen from going backwards into the bladder. However, the medications do have many side effects and they have to be taken at least 1–2 hours prior to sexual intercourse. In many cases, the medications fail to work at the right time because most men are not able to predict when they will have an orgasm.

=== Infertility treatments ===
If a couple is experiencing infertility as a result of retrograde ejaculation and medications are not helping, the collection of the semen collection may undergo a special procedure. First, the patient alkalinizes his urine by intake of sodium bicarbonate (3g dissolved in water in the evening before bed, and then another dose after complete bladder emptying right before going to the laboratory). Before semen collection the patient must empty his bladder. The patient then has to masturbate in one container and immediately after has to urinate in another container. The male's ejaculate may be centrifuged from urine voided, and the isolated sperm injected directly into the woman through the use of intrauterine insemination. In more severe cases, in-vitro fertilization with intracytoplasmic sperm injection may be used.

== Intentional induction ==
Retrograde ejaculation can be deliberately induced by squeezing the urethra at the base or applying pressure to the perineum during orgasm. The retrograde-ejaculated sperm goes into the bladder and is excreted with the next urination.

=== Contraception ===
In certain cultures, such as in the Oneida Community, retrograde ejaculation is performed as a form of primitive male birth control (coitus saxonicus). However, the practice is not considered a reliable method compared to most modern types of birth control. Besides the lack of protection from STDs, the technique itself can be hard to execute correctly during the act of coitus, especially if the male does not fully understand the anatomy involved. Many doctors also do not recommend coitus saxonicus due to the risk of putting pressure on the pudendal nerve, which can cause numbness in the penis.

=== Taoism ===
Taoists and some fields of alternative medicine recommend and teach deliberate retrograde ejaculation as a way of "conserving the body's energy". It was believed that retrograde ejaculation caused the sperm to travel into the head and nourish the brain, or that energy is conserved physically by keeping the sperm (and thereby, the "intelligence" that created it) in the body. However, there are other Taoist perspectives on the general subject of ejaculation and techniques that do not involve retrograde ejaculation (see Taoist sexual practices).

== See also ==
- Aspermia
- Ejaculatory duct obstruction
- Hypospermia
- Internal urethral sphincter
- Spermaturia
