= Compartmentalized ciliogenesis =

Type of ciliogenesis

Compartmentalized ciliogenesis is the most common type of ciliogenesis where the cilium axoneme is formed separated from the cytoplasm by the ciliary membrane and a ciliary gate known as the transition zone.
