= Pronucleus =

Nucleus of a sperm or an egg cell during fertilization

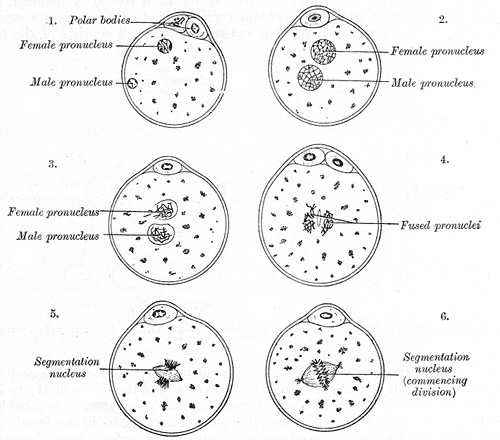
The process of fertilization in the ovum of a mouse

A pronucleus (pl.: pronuclei) denotes the nucleus found in either a sperm or egg cell during the process of fertilization. The sperm cell undergoes a transformation into a pronucleus after entering the egg cell but prior to the fusion of the genetic material of both the sperm and egg. In contrast, the egg cell possesses a pronucleus once it becomes haploid, not upon the arrival of the sperm cell. Haploid cells, such as sperm and egg cells in humans, carry half the number of chromosomes present in somatic cells, with 23 chromosomes compared to the 46 found in somatic cells. It is noteworthy that the male and female pronuclei do not physically merge, although their genetic material does. Instead, their membranes dissolve, eliminating any barriers between the male and female chromosomes, facilitating the combination of their chromosomes into a single diploid nucleus in the resulting embryo, which contains a complete set of 46 chromosomes.

The presence of two pronuclei serves as the initial indication of successful fertilization, often observed around 18 hours after insemination, or intracytoplasmic sperm injection (ICSI) during in vitro fertilization. At this stage, the zygote is termed a two-pronuclear zygote (2PN). Two-pronuclear zygotes transitioning through 1PN or 3PN states tend to yield poorer-quality embryos compared to those maintaining 2PN status throughout development, and this distinction may hold significance in the selection of embryos during in vitro fertilization (IVF) procedures.

== History ==
The pronucleus was discovered the 1870s microscopically using staining techniques combined with microscopes with improved magnification levels. The pronucleus was originally found during the first studies on meiosis. Edouard Van Beneden published a paper in 1875 in which he first mentions the pronucleus by studying the eggs of rabbits and bats. He stated that the two pronuclei form together in the center of the cell to form the embryonic nucleus. Van Beneden also found that the sperm enters into the cell through the membrane in order to form the male pronucleus. In 1876, Oscar Hertwig did a study on sea urchin eggs because the eggs of sea urchins are transparent, so it allowed for much better magnification of the egg. Hertwig confirmed Van Beneden's finding of the pronucleus, and also found the formation of the female pronucleus involves the formation of polar bodies.

== Formation ==
The female pronucleus is the female egg cell once it has become a haploid cell, and the male pronucleus forms when the sperm enters into the female egg. While the sperm develops inside of the male testes, the sperm does not become a pronucleus until it decondenses quickly inside of the female egg. When the sperm reaches the female egg, the sperm loses its outside membrane as well as its tail. The sperm does this because the membrane and the tail are no longer needed by the female ovum. The purpose of the cell membrane was to protect the DNA from the acidic vaginal fluid, and the purpose of the tail of the sperm was to help move the sperm cell to the egg cell. The formation of the female egg is asymmetrical, while the formation of the male sperm is symmetrical. Typically in a female mammal, meiosis starts with one diploid cell and becomes one haploid ovum and typically two polar bodies, however one may later divide to form a third polar body. In a male, meiosis starts with one diploid cell and ends with four sperm. In mammals, the female pronucleus starts in the center of the egg before fertilization. When the male pronucleus is formed, after the sperm cell reaches the egg, the two pronuclei migrate towards each other. However, in brown alga Pelvetia, the egg pronucleus starts in the center of the egg before fertilization and remain in the center after fertilization. This is because the egg cells of brown alga Pelvetia, the egg pronucleus is anchored down by microtubules so only the male pronucleus migrates towards the female pronucleus.

=== Calcium concentration ===
The calcium concentration within the egg cell cytoplasm has a very important role in the formation of an activated female egg. If there is no calcium influx, the female diploid cell will produce three pronuclei, rather than only one. This is due to the failure of release of the second polar body.

== Combination of male and female pronuclei ==
In sea urchins, the formation of the zygote starts with the fusion of both the inner and outer nuclei of the male and female pronuclei. It is unknown if one of the pronuclei start the combination of the two, or if the microtubules that help the dissolution of membranes commence the action. The microtubules that make the two pronuclei combine come from the sperm's centrosome. There is a study that strongly supports that microtubules are an important part of the fusion of the pronuclei. Vinblastine is a chemotherapy drug that affects both the plus and minus ends of microtubules. When vinblastine is added to the ovum, there is a high rate of pronuclear fusion failure. This high rate of pronuclear fusion failure highly suggests that microtubules play a major role in the fusion of the pronucleus. In mammals, the pronuclei only last in the cell for about twelve hours, due to the fusion of the genetic material of the two pronuclei within the egg cell. Many studies of pronuclei have been in the egg cells of sea urchins, where the pronuclei are in the egg cell for less than an hour. The main difference between the process of fusion of genetic materials in mammals versus sea urchins is that in sea urchins, the pronuclei go directly into forming a zygote nucleus. In mammalian egg cells, the chromatin from the pronuclei form chromosomes that merge onto the same mitotic spindle. The diploid nucleus in mammals is first seen at the two-cell stage, whereas in sea urchins it is first found at the zygote stage.
