= Comet assay =

Test for damage to DNA

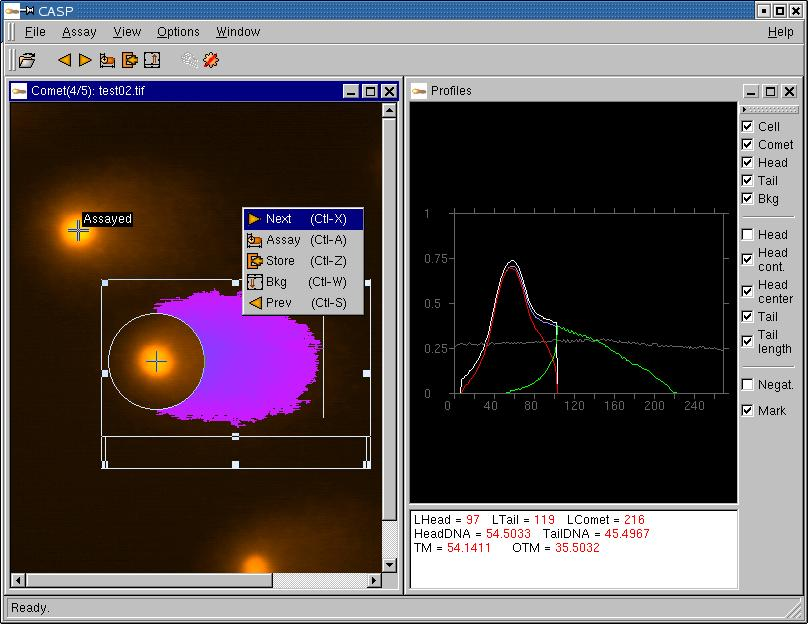
CaspLab comet assay application screenshot

The single cell gel electrophoresis assay (SCGE, also known as comet assay) is an uncomplicated and sensitive technique for the detection of DNA damage at the level of the individual eukaryotic cell. It was first developed by Östling & Johansson in 1984 and later modified by Singh et al. in 1988. It has since increased in popularity as a standard technique for evaluation of DNA damage/repair, biomonitoring and genotoxicity testing. It involves the encapsulation of cells in a low-melting-point agarose suspension, lysis of the cells in neutral or alkaline (pH>13) conditions, and electrophoresis of the suspended lysed cells. The term "comet" refers to the pattern of DNA migration through the electrophoresis gel, which often resembles a comet.

The comet assay (single-cell gel electrophoresis) is a simple method for measuring deoxyribonucleic acid (DNA) strand breaks in eukaryotic cells. Cells embedded in agarose on a microscope slide are lysed with detergent and high salt to form nucleoids containing supercoiled loops of DNA linked to the nuclear matrix. Electrophoresis at high pH results in structures resembling comets, observed by fluorescence microscopy; the intensity of the comet tail relative to the head reflects the number of DNA breaks. The likely basis for this is that loops containing a break lose their supercoiling and become free to extend toward the anode. This is followed by visual analysis with staining of DNA and calculating fluorescence to determine the extent of DNA damage. This can be performed by manual scoring or automatically by imaging software.

== Procedure ==
=== Encapsulation ===
A sample of cells, either derived from an in vitro cell culture or from an in vivo test subject is dispersed into individual cells and suspended in molten low-melting-point agarose at 37 °C. This mono-suspension is cast on a microscope slide. A glass cover slip is held at an angle and the mono-suspension is applied to the point of contact between the coverslip and the slide. As the coverslip is lowered onto the slide the molten agarose spreads to form a thin layer. The agarose is gelled at 4 °C and the coverslip removed.

The agarose forms a matrix of carbohydrate fibres that encapsulate the cells, anchoring them in place. The agarose is considered to be osmotic-neutral, therefore solutions can penetrate the gel and affect the cells without cells shifting position.

In an in vitro study the cells would be exposed to a test agent – typically UV light, ionising radiation, or a genotoxic chemical – to induce DNA damage in the encapsulated cells. For calibration, hydrogen peroxide is usually used to provide a standardized level of DNA damage.

=== Lysis ===
The slides are then immersed in a solution that cause the cells to lyse. The lysis solution often used in the comet assay consists of a highly concentrated aqueous salt (often, common table salt can be used) and a detergent (such as Triton X-100 or sarcosinate). The pH of the lysis solution can be adjusted (usually between neutral and alkaline pH) depending upon the type of damage the researcher is investigating.

The aqueous salt disrupts proteins and their bonding patterns within the cell as well as disrupting the RNA content of the cell. The detergent dissolves the cellular membranes. Through the action of the lysis solution the cells are destroyed. All proteins, RNA, membranes and cytoplasmic and nucleoplasmic constituents are disrupted and diffuse into the agarose matrix. Only the DNA of the cell remains, and unravels to fill the cavity in the agarose that the whole cell formerly filled. This structure is called nucleoid (a general term for a structure in which DNA is concentrated).

=== Electrophoresis ===
After lysis of the cells (typically 1 to 2 hours at 4 °C) the slides are washed in distilled water to remove all salts and immersed in a second solution – an electrophoresis solution. Again this solution can have its pH adjusted depending upon the type of damage that is being investigated.

The slides are left for ~20 minutes in the electrophoresis solution prior to an electric field being applied. In alkaline conditions the DNA double helix is denatured and the nucleoid becomes single stranded.

An electric field is applied (typically 1 V/cm) for ~20 minutes. The slides are then neutralised to pH 7, stained with a DNA-specific fluorescent stain and analysed using a microscope with an attached CCD (charge-coupled device – essentially a digital camera) that is connected to a computer with image analysis software.

== Background ==
The concept underlying the SCGE assay is that undamaged DNA retains a highly organized association with matrix proteins in the nucleus. When damaged, this organization is disrupted. The individual strands of DNA lose their compact structure and relax, expanding out of the cavity into the agarose. When the electric field is applied the DNA, which has an overall negative charge, is drawn towards the positively charged anode. Undamaged DNA strands are too large and do not leave the cavity, whereas the smaller the fragments, the farther they are free to move in a given period of time. Therefore, the amount of DNA that leaves the cavity is a measure of the amount of DNA damage in the cell.

The image analysis measures the overall intensity of the fluorescence for the whole nucleoid and the fluorescence of the migrated DNA and compares the two signals. The stronger the signal from the migrated DNA the more damage there is present. The overall structure resembles a comet (hence "comet assay") with a circular head corresponding to the undamaged DNA that remains in the cavity and a tail of damaged DNA. The brighter and longer the tail, the higher the level of damage.

The comet assay is a versatile technique for detecting damage and with adjustments to the protocol can be used to quantify the presence of a wide variety of DNA altering lesions (damage). The damage usually detected are single strand breaks and double strand breaks. It is sometimes stated that alkaline conditions and complete denaturating of the DNA is necessary to detect single strand breaks. However this is not true, both single- and double strand breaks are also detected in neutral conditions. In alkaline conditions, however, additional DNA structures are detected as DNA damage: AP sites (abasic sites missing either a pyrimidine or purine nucleotide) and sites where excision repair is taking place.

The comet assay is an extremely sensitive DNA damage assay. This sensitivity needs to be handled carefully as it is also vulnerable to physical changes which can affect the reproducibility of results. Essentially, anything that can cause DNA damage or denaturation except the factor(s) being researched is to be avoided. The most common form of the assay is the alkaline version although there is as yet no definitive alkaline assay protocol. Due to its simple and inexpensive setup, it can be used in conditions where more complex assays are not available.

== Applications ==
These include genotoxicity testing, human biomonitoring and molecular epidemiology, ecogenotoxicology, as well as fundamental research in DNA damage and repair. For example, Swain and Rao, using the comet assay reported marked increases in several types of DNA damages in rat brain neurons and astrocytes during aging, including single-strand breaks, double-strand breaks and modified bases (8-OHdG and uracil).

=== Sperm DNA fragmentation ===
A comet assay can determine the degree of DNA fragmentation in sperm cells. The degree of DNA fragmentation has been associated with outcomes of in vitro fertilization.

The comet assay has been modified for use with sperm cells as a tool for male infertility diagnosis.

To break down these tightly bound protamine proteins in order to use the comet for sperm, additional steps in the de-condensation protocol are required.
