= Sperm =

Male reproductive cell

Spermatozoon
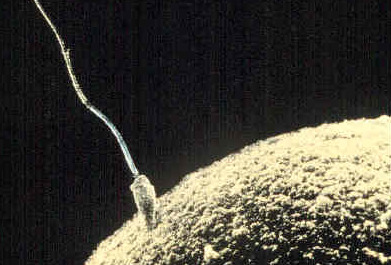
- Motile sperm cell attempting to penetrate an ovum's coating to fertilize it.

- Diagram of a human spermatozoon

Details

Identifiers
- Latin: spermatozoon
- Greek: σπερματοζωάριο

Sperm (pl.: sperm or sperms) is the male reproductive cell, or gamete, in anisogamous forms of sexual reproduction (forms in which there is a larger, female reproductive cell and a smaller, male one). Sperm cells contribute approximately half of the nuclear genetic information to the diploid offspring (excluding, in most cases, mitochondrial DNA). Animals produce motile sperm with a tail known as a flagellum, which are known as spermatozoa, while some red algae and fungi produce non-motile sperm cells, known as spermatia. Flowering plants contain non-motile sperm inside pollen, while some more basal plants like ferns and some gymnosperms have motile sperm.

Sperm cells form during the process known as spermatogenesis, which in amniotes (reptiles and mammals) takes place in the seminiferous tubules of the testicles. This process involves the production of several successive sperm cell precursors, starting with spermatogonia, which differentiate into spermatocytes. The spermatocytes then undergo meiosis, reducing their chromosome number by half, which produces spermatids. The spermatids then mature and, in animals, construct a tail, or flagellum, which gives rise to the mature, motile sperm cell. This whole process occurs constantly and takes around 3 months from start to finish.

Sperm cells cannot divide and have a limited lifespan, but after fusion with egg cells during fertilization, a new organism begins developing, starting as a totipotent zygote. The human sperm cell is haploid, so that its 23 chromosomes can join the 23 chromosomes of the female egg to form a diploid cell with 46 paired chromosomes. In mammals, sperm is stored in the epididymis and released through the penis in semen during ejaculation.

The word sperm is derived from the Greek word σπέρμα, sperma, meaning "seed".

Video of human sperm cells under a microscope

== Evolution ==
It is generally accepted that isogamy is the ancestor to sperm and eggs. Because there are no fossil records of the evolution of sperm and eggs from isogamy, there is a strong emphasis on mathematical models to understand the evolution of sperm.

A widespread hypothesis states that sperm evolved rapidly, but there is no direct evidence that sperm evolved at a fast rate or before other male characteristics.

== Sperm in humans ==
=== Function ===
The main sperm function is to reach the ovum and fuse with it to deliver two sub-cellular structures: (i) the male pronucleus that contains the genetic material and (ii) the centrioles that are structures that help organize the microtubule cytoskeleton.

The nuclear DNA in sperm cells is haploid; that is, they contribute only one copy of each paternal chromosome pair. Mitochondria in human sperm contain no or very little DNA because mtDNA is degraded while sperm cells are maturing, hence they typically do not contribute any genetic material to their offspring.

In mammals, sperm cells normally come in two types, "female" and "male", named for the resulting sex of the fertilized zygote each produces after fusing with the ovum. Sperm cells that produce female (karyotype XX) offspring carry an X-chromosome, while sperm cells that produce male (XY) offspring carry a Y-chromosome. Errors of meiosis may lead to the formation of sperm containing different arrangements of sex chromosomes, either altogether missing (monosomy, designated "0"), or in multiples (trisomy), such as "XX", "XY", etc... some of the conditions known as Disorders of Sex Development (DSD) are the result of fertilization by such defective sperm.

The sperm cell of Homo sapiens is the small reproductive cell produced by males, and can only survive in warm environments; upon leaving the body, it starts to degrade, thereby decreasing the total sperm quality.

Semen has an alkaline nature and the spermatozoa do not reach full motility (hypermotility) until they reach the vagina, where the alkaline pH is neutralized by acidic vaginal fluids. This gradual process takes 20–30 minutes. During this period, fibrinogen from the seminal vesicles forms a clot, securing and protecting the sperm. Just as they become hypermotile, fibrinolysin from the prostate gland dissolves the clot, allowing the sperm to progress optimally.

==== DNA damage and repair ====
DNA damages present in spermatozoa in the period after meiosis but before fertilization may be repaired in the fertilized egg, but if not repaired, can have serious deleterious effects on fertility and the developing embryo. Human spermatozoa are particularly vulnerable to free radical attack and the generation of oxidative DNA damage. (see e.g. 8-Oxo-2'-deoxyguanosine)

Exposure of males to certain lifestyle, environmental or occupational hazards may increase the risk of aneuploid spermatozoa. In particular, risk of aneuploidy is increased by tobacco smoking, and occupational exposure to benzene, insecticides, and perfluorinated compounds. Increased aneuploidy of spermatozoa often occurs in association with increased DNA damage. DNA fragmentation and increased in situ DNA susceptibility to denaturation, the features similar to these seen during apoptosis of somatic cells, characterize abnormal spermatozoa in cases of male infertility.

Although DNA repair has long been considered impossible in human spermatozoa due to the high level of DNA compaction in these cells, human spermatozoa possess a truncated base excision repair pathway that is mediated by 8-oxoguanine DNA glycosylase 1 (OGG1). Thus mature spermatozoa appear to have a limited capacity to mount a DNA repair response to oxidative stress.

==== Avoidance of immune system response ====
Glycoprotein molecules on the surface of ejaculated sperm cells are recognized by all human female immune systems, and interpreted as a signal that the cell should not be rejected. The female immune system might otherwise attack sperm in the reproductive tract. The specific glycoproteins coating sperm cells are also utilized by some cancerous and bacterial cells, some parasitic worms, and HIV-infected white blood cells, thereby avoiding an immune response from the host organism.

The blood-testis barrier, maintained by the tight junctions between the Sertoli cells of the seminiferous tubules, prevents communication between the forming spermatozoa in the testis and the blood vessels (and immune cells circulating within them) within the interstitial space. This prevents them from eliciting an immune response. The blood-testis barrier is also important in preventing toxic substances from disrupting spermatogenesis.

=== Anatomy ===
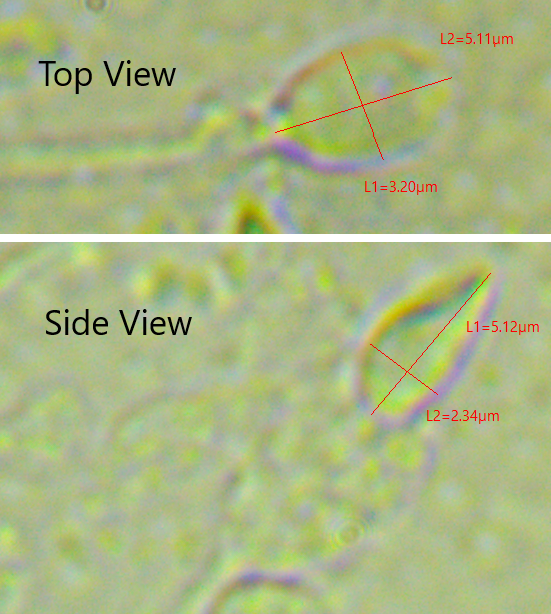
Dimensions of the human sperm head measured from a 39-year-old healthy human subject

The mammalian sperm cell can be divided in 2 parts connected by a neck:

- Head: contains the nucleus with densely coiled chromatin fibers, surrounded anteriorly by a thin, flattened sac called the acrosome, formed by modification of the Golgi body, which contains enzymes such as spermlysin (hyaluronidase, corona-penetrating enzyme, zona lysin, or acrosin) used for penetrating the female egg. It also contains vacuoles. As the spermatozoon approaches the ovum, it undergoes the acrosome reaction in which the membrane surrounding the acrosome fuses with the plasma membrane of the sperm's head, exposing the contents of the acrosome. The head of a human sperm is disc shaped, and approximately 5.1 by 3.1 μm (0.20 by 0.12 mils).
- Tail: also called the flagellum, is the longest part, at approximately 50 μm (0.050 mm). It is capable of wave-like motion that propels sperm for swimming and aids in the penetration of the egg. The flagellum propels the sperm cell at about 1 to 3 millimetres per minute (0.66 to 1.97 mils per second). The tail was formerly thought to move symmetrically in a helical shape.
- Neck: also called connecting piece contains one typical centriole and one atypical centriole such as the proximal centriole-like. The proximal centriole is retained in the mature spermatozoon; the distal centriole disappears after axoneme assembly. The proximal centriole enters into the ovum, which has no centriole, and starts the first cleavage division of the zygote thus formed. The distal centriole gives rise to the axial filament which forms the tail and has a (9+2) arrangement. A transitory membrane called the Manchette lies in the midpiece.
- Midpiece: It has 10–14 spirals of mitochondria surrounding the axial filament in the cytoplasm. It provides motility, and hence is called the powerhouse of the sperm. It also has a ring centriole (annulus) that form a diffusion barrier between the midpiece and the principal piece and serve as a stabilizing structure for tail rigidity.

Sperm have an olfactory guidance mechanism, and after reaching the fallopian tubes, must undergo a period of capacitation before penetration of the ovum.

During fertilization, the sperm provides three essential parts to the oocyte: (1) a signalling or oocyte-activating factor (OAF), which causes the metabolically dormant oocyte to activate; (2) the haploid paternal genome; (3) the centriole, which is responsible for forming the centrosome and microtubule system. It may also contribute with paternal messenger RNA (mRNA), also contributing to embryonic development.

The spermatozoon is characterized by a minimum of cytoplasm and the most densely packed DNA known in eukaryotes. Compared to mitotic chromosomes in somatic cells, sperm DNA is at least sixfold more highly condensed.

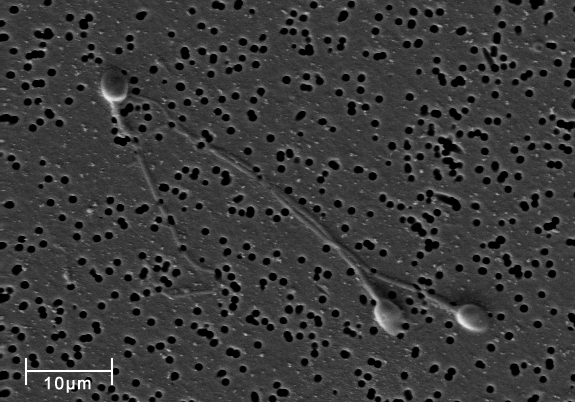
Electron micrograph of human spermatozoa magnified 3140 times.

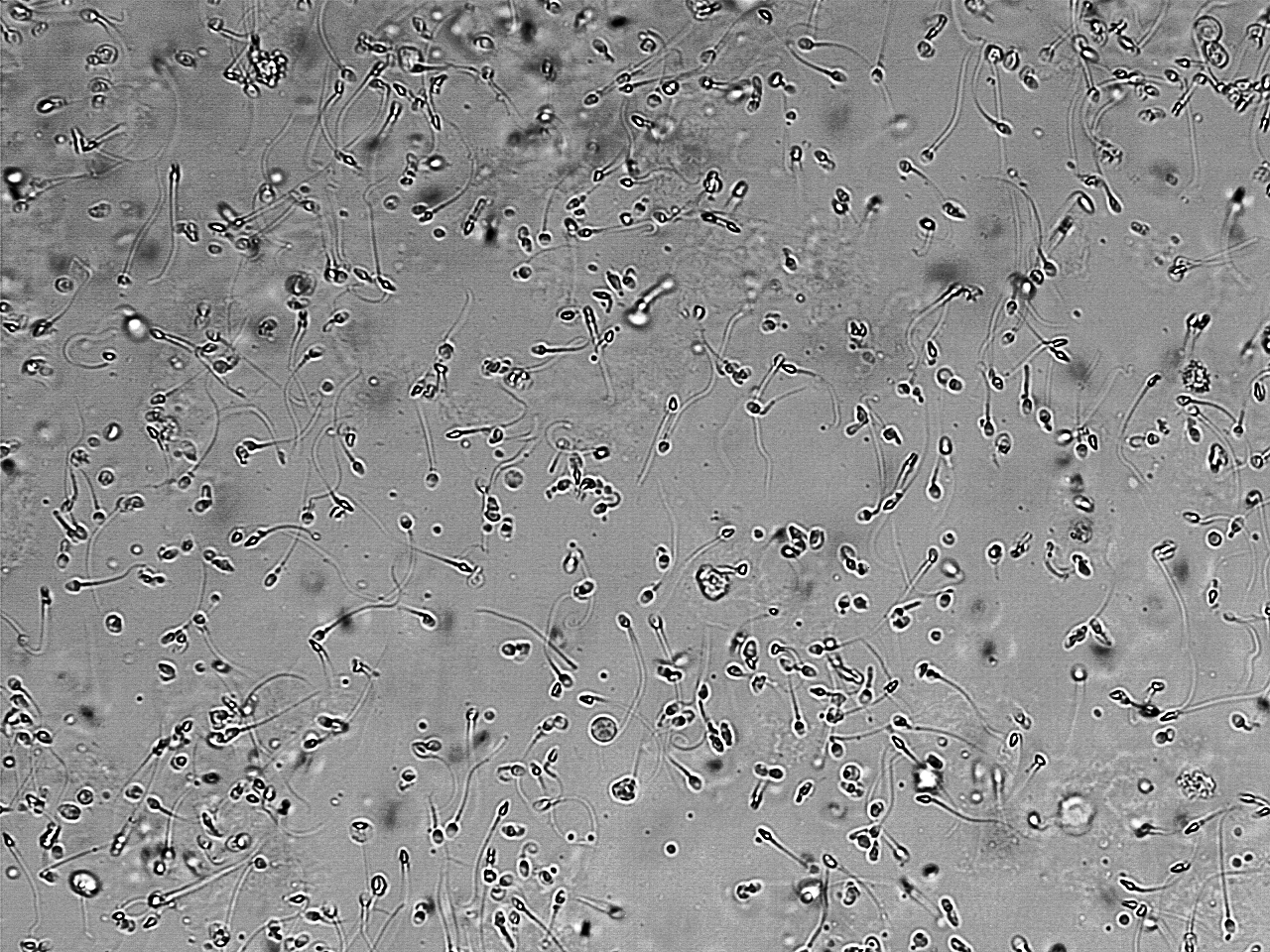
Sperm cells in the urine sample of a 45-year-old male patient who is being followed with the diagnosis of benign prostate hyperplasia.

=== Sperm size ===
Related to sperm quality is sperm size, at least in some animals. For instance, the sperm of some species of fruit fly (Drosophila) are up to 5.8 cm long—about 20 times as long as the fly itself. Longer sperm cells are better than their shorter counterparts at displacing competitors from the female's seminal receptacle. The benefit to females is that only healthy males carry "good" genes that can produce long sperm in sufficient quantities to outcompete their competitors.

=== Sperm activation ===
Acrosome reaction on a sea urchin cell

Approaching the egg cell is a rather complex, multistep process of chemotaxis guided by different chemical substances/stimuli on individual levels of phylogeny. One of the most significant, common signaling characters of the event is that a prototype of professional chemotaxis receptors, formyl peptide receptor (60,000 receptor/cell) as well as the activator ability of its ligand formyl Met-Leu-Phe have been demonstrated in the surface membrane even in the case of human sperms. Mammalian sperm cells become even more active when they approach an egg cell in a process called sperm activation. Sperm activation has been shown to be caused by calcium ionophores in vitro, progesterone released by nearby cumulus cells and binding to ZP3 of the zona pellucida. The cumulus cells are embedded in a gel-like substance made primarily of hyaluronic acid, and developed in the ovary with the egg and support it as it grows.

The initial change is called "hyperactivation", which causes a change in spermatozoa motility. They swim faster and their tail movements become more forceful and erratic.

A recent discovery links hyperactivation to a sudden influx of calcium ion into the tails. The whip-like tail (flagellum) of the sperm is studded with ion channels formed by proteins called CatSper. These channels are selective, allowing only calcium ions to pass. The opening of CatSper channels is responsible for the influx of calcium. The sudden rise in calcium levels causes the flagellum to form deeper bends, propelling the sperm more forcefully through the viscous environment. Sperm hyperactivity is necessary for breaking through two physical barriers that protect the egg from fertilization.

The second process in sperm activation is the acrosome reaction. This involves releasing the contents of the acrosome, which disperse, and the exposure of enzymes attached to the inner acrosomal membrane of the sperm. This occurs after the sperm first meets the egg. This lock-and-key type mechanism is species-specific and prevents the sperm and egg of different species from fusing. There is some evidence that this binding is what triggers the acrosome to release the enzymes that allow the sperm to fuse with the egg.

ZP3, one of the proteins that make up the zona pellucida, then binds to a partner molecule on the sperm. Enzymes on the inner acrosomal membrane digest the zona pellucida. After the sperm penetrates the zona pellucida, part of the sperm's cell membrane then fuses with the egg cell's membrane, and the contents of the head diffuse into the egg.

Upon penetration, the oocyte is said to have become activated. It undergoes its secondary meiotic division, and the two haploid nuclei (paternal and maternal) fuse to form a zygote. Several changes to the egg's zona pellucida renders them impenetrable shortly after the first sperm enters the egg, which prevents polyspermy and minimises the possibility of producing a triploid zygote.

=== Origin ===
The spermatozoa of animals are produced through spermatogenesis inside the male gonads (testicles) via meiotic division. The initial spermatozoon process takes around 70 days to complete. The process starts with the production of spermatogonia from germ cell precursors. These divide and differentiate into spermatocytes, which undergo meiosis to form spermatids. In the spermatid stage, the sperm develops the familiar tail. The next stage where it becomes fully mature takes around 60 days when it is called a spermatozoan. Human sperm cells can survive within the female reproductive tract for more than 5 days post coitus. Mammalian sperm cells are ejaculated through the penis in a fluid known as semen, which is produced in the seminal vesicles, prostate gland and urethral glands.

In 2016, scientists at Nanjing Medical University claimed they had produced cells resembling mouse spermatids from mouse embryonic stem cells artificially. They injected these spermatids into mouse eggs and produced pups.

Spermatozoa are produced in the seminiferous tubules of the testicles in a process called spermatogenesis. Round cells called spermatogonia divide and differentiate eventually to become spermatozoa. During copulation, the cloaca or vagina gets inseminated, and then the spermatozoa move through chemotaxis to the ovum inside an oviduct.

== Assisted reproductive technology ==
In assisted reproductive technology, normozoospermia is referred to a total amount of >39 mill ejaculated, >32% with progressive motility and >4% normal morphology. Also, a normal ejaculation in humans must have a volume over 1.5 ml, being an excessive volume 6 ml per ejaculation (hyperspermia). An insufficient volume is called hypospermia. These problems are related to several complications in spermatozoa production, for example:

- Hyperspermia: usually provoked because of prostate inflammation.
- Hypospermia: an incomplete ejaculation, usually referred to an androgen deficit (hypoandrogenism) or obstruction in some part of the ejaculatory duct. In laboratory conditions, is also due to a partial loss of the sample.
- Aspermia: there is no ejaculation. It could happen due to retrograde ejaculation, anatomical or neurological diseases or anti-hypertensive drugs.

In a legal ruling announced in 2009, the England and Wales Court of Appeal ruled that ejaculated sperm, preserved for reproductive purposes, were the property of the men who had ejaculated them. Lord Judge referred to a California legal case concerning ejaculated sperm, Hecht v Superior Court of Los Angeles County (1993) 20 Cal. Rptr, 2d 275 as being "of considerable interest" in allowing him to think through his ruling.

=== Sperm quality ===
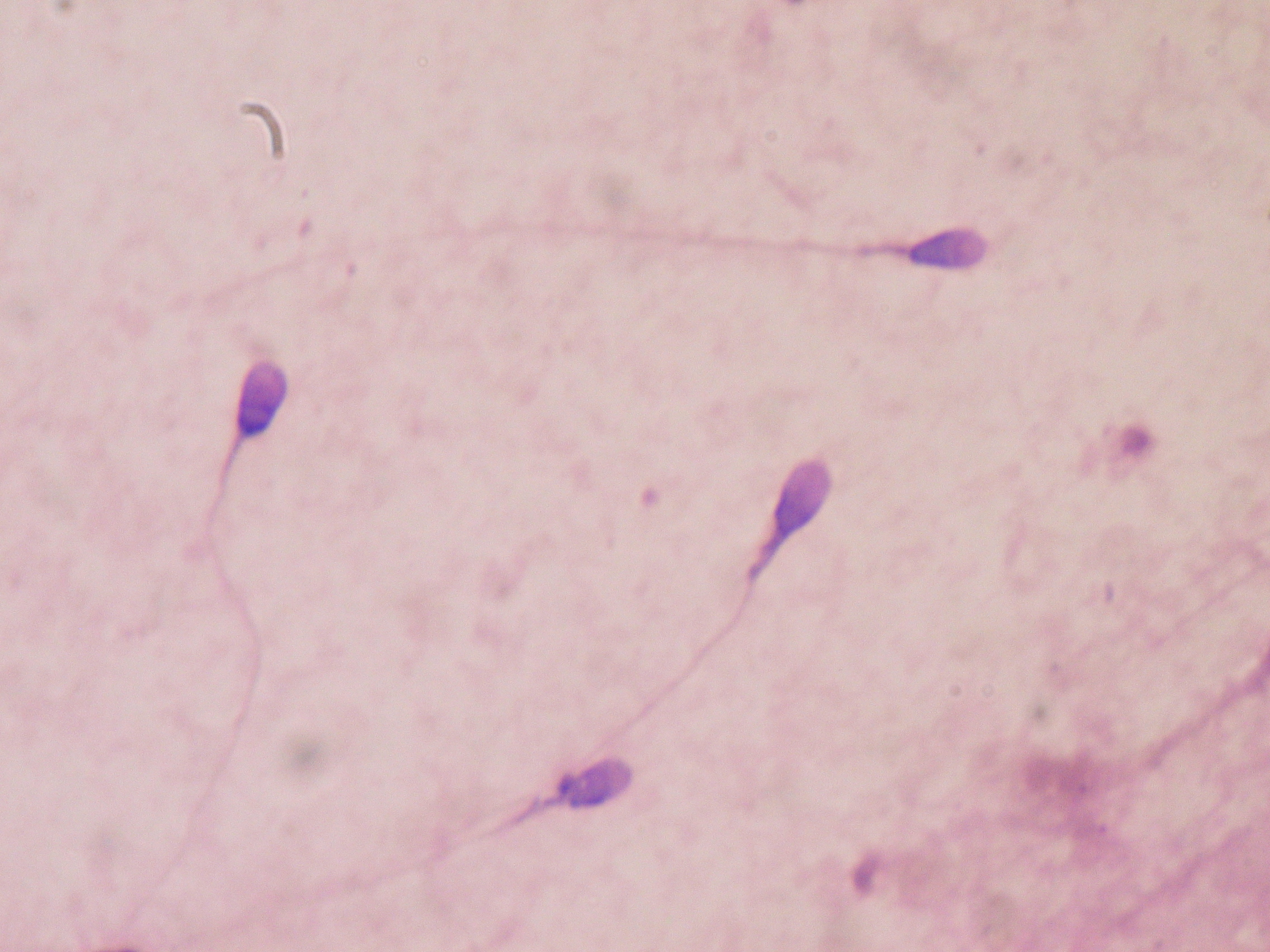
Human sperm stained for semen quality testing

Sperm quantity and quality are the main parameters in semen quality, which is a measure of the ability of semen to accomplish fertilization. Thus, in humans, it is a measure of fertility in a man. The genetic quality of sperm, as well as its volume and motility, all typically decrease with age. DNA double-strand breaks in sperm increase with age. Also apoptosis decreases with age suggesting that the increase in damaged DNA of sperm as men age occurs partly as a result of less efficient cell selection (apoptosis) operating during or after spermatogenesis.

DNA damages present in sperm cells in the period after meiosis but before fertilization may be repaired in the fertilized egg, but if not repaired, can have serious deleterious effects on fertility and the developing embryo. Human sperm cells are particularly vulnerable to free radical attack and the generation of oxidative DNA damage, such as that from 8-Oxo-2'-deoxyguanosine.

The postmeiotic phase of mouse spermatogenesis is very sensitive to environmental genotoxic agents, because as male germ cells form mature sperm they progressively lose the ability to repair DNA damage. Irradiation of male mice during late spermatogenesis can induce damage that persists for at least seven days in the fertilizing sperm cells, and disruption of maternal DNA double-strand break repair pathways increases sperm cell-derived chromosomal aberrations. Treatment of male mice with melphalan, a bifunctional alkylating agent frequently employed in chemotherapy, induces DNA lesions during meiosis that may persist in an unrepaired state as germ cells progress through DNA repair-competent phases of spermatogenic development. Such unrepaired DNA damages in sperm cells, after fertilization, can lead to offspring with various abnormalities.

=== MMP and capacitation ===
The capacitation is the final phase of spermatozoa development, when they acquire the capability to fertilize the oocyte. In vivo, it happens during ejaculation, when spermatozoa leave the vagina and come in the superior female reproductive tract. In vitro, it happens when the spermatozoa is washed and purified. Almost 30-40% of infertility is due to male factor, so several strategies have been created in order to recover the functional spermatozoa. The MMP (Million Motile Progressive cells per milliliter) measure is synonymous with capacitation, and is very useful parameter to decide, along with a spermiogram, the kind of treatment needed. It represents the ratio between the % of progressive motile sperm obtained in capacitated and the % of progressive motile sperm obtained in ejaculated. It is based on the recovery percentage.

For example, if more than 1.0 million progressive motile sperm per milliliter are found, it will be recommended to have sexual intercourse, and if that fails, the next step will be intrauterine insemination and later conventional in vitro fertilization.

=== Market for human sperm ===
Some sperm banks hold up to 170 litres (37 imp gal; 45 US gal) of sperm.

In addition to ejaculation, it is possible to extract sperm through testicular sperm extraction.

On the global market, Denmark has a well-developed system of human sperm export. This success mainly comes from the reputation of Danish sperm donors for being of high quality and, in contrast with the law in the other Nordic countries, gives donors the choice of being either anonymous or non-anonymous to the receiving couple. Furthermore, Nordic sperm donors tend to be tall and highly educated and have altruistic motives for their donations, partly due to the relatively low monetary compensation in Nordic countries. More than 50 countries worldwide are importers of Danish sperm, including Paraguay, Canada, Kenya, and Hong Kong. However, the Food and Drug Administration (FDA) of the US has banned import of any sperm, motivated by a risk of transmission of Creutzfeldt–Jakob disease, although such a risk is insignificant, since artificial insemination is very different from the route of transmission of Creutzfeldt–Jakob disease. The prevalence of Creutzfeldt–Jakob disease for donors is at most one in a million, and if the donor was a carrier, the infectious proteins would still have to cross the blood-testis barrier to make transmission possible.

== Forensic analysis ==
Ejaculated fluids are detected by ultraviolet light, irrespective of the structure or colour of the surface. Sperm heads, e.g. from vaginal swabs, are still detected by microscopy using the "Christmas Tree Stain" method, i.e., Kernechtrot-Picroindigocarmine (KPIC) staining.

== Artificial storage ==
Spermatozoa can be stored in diluents such as the Illini Variable Temperature (IVT) diluent, which have been reported to be able to preserve high fertility of spermatozoa for over seven days. The IVT diluent is composed of several salts, sugars and antibacterial agents and gassed with CO_{2}.

Semen cryopreservation can be used for far longer storage durations. For human spermatozoa, the longest reported successful storage with this method is 21 years.

== Sperm in other animals ==
Fertilization relies on spermatozoa for most sexually reproductive animals.

Some species of fruit fly produce the largest known spermatozoon found in nature. Drosophila melanogaster produces sperm that can be up to 1.8 mm, while its relative Drosophila bifurca produces the largest known spermatozoon, measuring over 58 mm in length. In Drosophila melanogaster, the entire sperm, tail included, gets incorporated into the oocyte cytoplasm, however, for Drosophila bifurca only a small portion of the tail enters the oocyte.

The wood mouse Apodemus sylvaticus possesses spermatozoa with falciform morphology. Another characteristics which makes these gametocytes unique is the presence of an apical hook on the sperm head. This hook is used to attach to the hooks or to the flagella of other spermatozoa. Aggregation is caused by these attachments and mobile trains result. These trains provide improved motility in the female reproductive tract and are a means by which fertilization is promoted.

The postmeiotic phase of mouse spermatogenesis is very sensitive to environmental genotoxic agents, because as male germ cells form mature spermatozoa they progressively lose the ability to repair DNA damage. Irradiation of male mice during late spermatogenesis can induce damage that persists for at least 7 days in the fertilizing spermatozoa, and disruption of maternal DNA double-strand break repair pathways increases spermatozoa-derived chromosomal aberrations. Treatment of male mice with melphalan, a bifunctional alkylating agent frequently employed in chemotherapy, induces DNA lesions during meiosis that may persist in an unrepaired state as germ cells progress through DNA repair-competent phases of spermatogenic development. Such unrepaired DNA damages in spermatozoa, after fertilization, can lead to offspring with various abnormalities.

Sea urchins such as Arbacia punctulata are ideal organisms to use in sperm research, they spawn large numbers of sperm into the sea, making them well-suited as model organisms for experiments.

The spermatozoa of marsupials are usually longer than those of placental mammals.

== Sperm in plants and other organisms ==
Sperm cells in algal and many plant gametophytes are produced in male gametangia (antheridia) via mitotic division. In flowering plants, sperm nuclei are produced inside pollen.

The gametophytes of bryophytes, ferns and some gymnosperms produce motile sperm cells, contrary to pollen grains employed in most gymnosperms and all angiosperms. This renders sexual reproduction in the absence of water impossible, since water is a necessary medium for sperm and egg to meet. Algae and lower plant sperm cells are often multi-flagellated (see image) and thus morphologically different from animal spermatozoa.

Some algae and fungi produce non-motile sperm cells, called spermatia. In higher plants and some algae and fungi, fertilization involves the migration of the sperm nucleus through a fertilization tube (e.g. pollen tube in higher plants) to reach the egg cell.

== Motile sperm cells ==
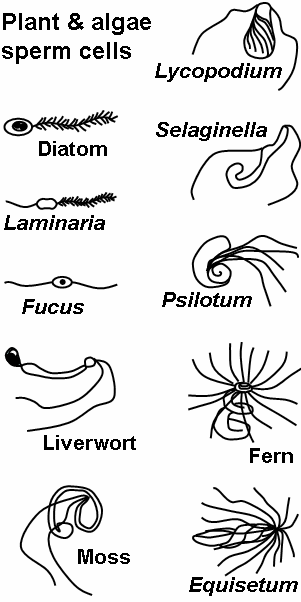
Motile sperm cells of algae and seedless plants

Motile sperm cells typically move via flagella and require a water medium in order to swim toward the egg for fertilization. In animals most of the energy for sperm motility is derived from the metabolism of fructose carried in the seminal fluid. This takes place in the mitochondria located in the sperm's midpiece (at the base of the sperm head). These cells cannot swim backwards due to the nature of their propulsion. The uniflagellated sperm cells (with one flagellum) of animals are referred to as spermatozoa, and are known to vary in size.

Motile sperm are also produced by many protists and the gametophytes of bryophytes, ferns and some gymnosperms such as cycads and ginkgo. The sperm cells are the only flagellated cells in the life cycle of these plants. In many ferns and lycophytes, cycads and ginkgo they are multi-flagellated (carrying more than one flagellum).

In nematodes, the sperm cells are amoeboid and crawl, rather than swim, towards the egg cell.

== Non-motile sperm cells ==
Non-motile sperm cells called spermatia lack flagella and therefore cannot swim. Spermatia are produced in a spermatangium.

Because spermatia cannot swim, they depend on their environment to carry them to the egg cell. Some red algae, such as Polysiphonia, produce non-motile spermatia that are spread by water currents after their release. The spermatia of rust fungi are covered with a sticky substance. They are produced in flask-shaped structures containing nectar, which attract flies that transfer the spermatia to nearby hyphae for fertilization in a mechanism similar to insect pollination in flowering plants.

Fungal spermatia (also called pycniospores, especially in the Uredinales) may be confused with conidia. Conidia are spores that germinate independently of fertilization, whereas spermatia are gametes that are required for fertilization. In some fungi, such as Neurospora crassa, spermatia are identical to microconidia as they can perform both functions of fertilization as well as giving rise to new organisms without fertilization.

== Sperm nuclei ==
In almost all embryophytes, including most gymnosperms and all angiosperms, the male gametophytes (pollen grains) are the primary mode of dispersal, for example via wind or insect pollination, eliminating the need for water to bridge the gap between male and female. Each pollen grain contains a spermatogenous (generative) cell. Once the pollen lands on the stigma of a receptive flower, it germinates and starts growing a pollen tube through the carpel. Before the tube reaches the ovule, the nucleus of the generative cell in the pollen grain divides and gives rise to two sperm nuclei, which are then discharged through the tube into the ovule for fertilization.

In some protists, fertilization also involves sperm nuclei, rather than cells, migrating toward the egg cell through a fertilization tube. Oomycetes form sperm nuclei in a syncytical antheridium surrounding the egg cells. The sperm nuclei reach the eggs through fertilization tubes, similar to the pollen tube mechanism in plants.

== Sperm centrioles ==
Most sperm cells have centrioles in the sperm neck. Sperm of many animals has two typical centrioles, known as the proximal centriole and distal centriole. Some animals (including humans and bovines) have a single typical centriole, the proximal centriole, as well as a second centriole with atypical structure. Mice and rats have no recognizable sperm centrioles. The fruit fly Drosophila melanogaster has a single centriole and an atypical centriole named the proximal centriole-like.

== Sperm tail formation ==
The sperm tail is a specialized type of cilium (aka flagella). In many animals the sperm tail is formed through the unique process of cytosolic ciliogenesis, in which all or part of the sperm tail's axoneme is formed in the cytoplasm or gets exposed to the cytoplasm.

== History ==
Sperm were first observed in 1677 by Antonie van Leeuwenhoek using a microscope. He described them as being animalcules (little animals), probably due to his belief in preformationism, which thought that each sperm contained a fully formed but small human.

In 1841 the Swiss anatomist Albert von Kölliker wrote about spermatozoon in his work Untersuchungen über die Bedeutung der Samenfäden (Studies on the importance of spermatozoa).

== See also ==
- List of distinct cell types in the adult human body
- Female sperm
- Female sperm storage
- Mendelian inheritance
- Polyspermy
- Sperm competition
- Sperm granuloma
- Sperm theft
- Aneuploidy
- Non-disjunction

== General and cited sources ==
- Fawcett, D. W. (1981). "Sperm Flagellum". In: D. W. Fawcett. The Cell, 2nd ed (registration required). Philadelphia: W. B. Saunders Company. pp. 604–640 (registration required). ISBN 9780721635842. OCLC 993416586.
- Lehti, M. S. and A. Sironen (October 2017). "Formation and function of sperm tail structures in association with sperm motility defects". Biol Reprod 97(4): 522–536. doi:10.1093/biolre/iox096.

Preceded by None	Stages of human development Sperm + Oocyte	Succeeded by Zygote
