= Necrospermia =

Sperm disorder

Necrospermia (or necrozoospermia) is a condition in which there is a low percentage of live and a very high percentage of immotile spermatozoa in semen.

Necrospermia is usually confused with asthenozoospermia, which is the inability of the sperm to move even when alive. To check for necrospermia, samples with a high percentage of immobile sperm are stained to check for vitality. If they are dead sperm they will be stained, as the membrane is broken and the dye enters indiscriminately. Necrozoospermia is a rare condition with a reported prevalence of 0.2–0.48% in infertile subjects.
