= Hyperspermia =

Condition in which a male has an abnormally large ejaculate volume

In medicine, hyperspermia is a condition characterized by an abnormally large amount of semen or ejaculate volume. It is typically defined as an ejaculate volume exceeding 5.5 mL. Hyperspermia is the opposite of hypospermia, which refers to a semen volume of less than 1.5 mL.

On its own, hyperspermia does not appear to directly affect sperm health. However, larger volumes of ejaculate may be associated with lower sperm concentration, which can result in reduced fertility.

In some cases, high semen volumes can be a symptom of male accessory gland infection.

== See also ==
- Spermatorrhea, a controversial condition involving excess involuntary ejaculation
- Hypospermia, a condition in which a man has an unusually low ejaculate volume
