= Teratospermia =

Medical condition of mis-shaped sperm

Teratospermia or teratozoospermia is a condition characterized by the presence of sperm with abnormal morphology that affects fertility in males.

== Causes ==
The causes of teratozoospermia are unknown in most cases. However, Hodgkin's disease, coeliac disease, and Crohn's disease may contribute in some instances. Lifestyle and habits (smoking, toxin exposure, etc.) can also cause poor morphology. Varicocele is another condition that is often associated with decreased normal forms (morphology).

In cases of globozoospermia (sperm with round heads), the Golgi apparatus is not transformed into the acrosome that is needed for fertilization.

== Symptoms and treatment ==
The presence of abnormally-shaped sperm can negatively affect fertility by preventing transport through the cervix and/or preventing sperm from adhering to the ovum. Achieving a pregnancy may be difficult.

In testing for teratozoospermia, sperm are collected, stained and analyzed under a microscope to detect abnormalities. These abnormalities may include heads that are large, small, tapered, or pyriform or tails that are abnormally shaped.

Antiestrogens have been shown to be effective in the treatment of teratozoospermia.

Teratozoospermia (including the globozoospermia type), may be treated by intracytoplasmic sperm injection (ICSI), injecting sperm directly into the egg. Once the egg is fertilized, abnormal sperm morphology does not appear to influence blastocyst development or blastocyst morphology. Even with severe teratozoospermia, microscopy can still detect the few sperm cells that have a "normal" morphology, allowing for optimal success rate.

== See also ==
- Male infertility
- Semen quality
