= Male infertility crisis =

Observed decline in male fertility

The male infertility crisis is an increase in male infertility since the mid-1970s. The issue attracted media attention after a 2017 meta-analysis found that sperm counts in Western countries had declined by 52.4 percent between 1973 and 2011. The decline is particularly prevalent in Western regions such as New Zealand, Australia, Europe, and North America. A 2022 meta-analysis noted declines in additional countries in Asia, Africa, Central America, and South America. This meta-analysis also suggests that the decline in sperm counts may be accelerating.

This decline in male fertility is the subject of research and debate. Proposed explanations include lifestyle factors, such as changes in diet and physical activity levels, and increased exposure to endocrine disrupting chemicals, such as those found in plastics and pesticides. Several studies also indicate that sustained periods of high ambient temperature consistently lower the quality of sperm in animals. Some scientists have questioned the extent of the crisis; the scientific community, however, generally acknowledges increasing male infertility as a men's-health issue.

== Media coverage and terminology ==
The term male fertility crisis dates to the 1970s. Increased awareness during the 1990s expanded the scope of research to address social and biological factors. Academia and the scientific community have reached consensus in favor of the use of the term male infertility crisis, citing it as necessary to prompt preventative action to remedy the issue in the present time before it affects future generations on a greater scale. Social commentators have said that the wide-ranging consequences of male infertility necessitate the use of crisis, since widespread involuntary childlessness can be viewed as a crisis.

Research analysis has found that amongst a sample of British newspapers in the 1990s, there was a recognizable discourse about a male fertility crisis. Media coverage increased during the 2010s, often coinciding with (or in response to) releases of studies and using words like "crisis", "apocalypse", "time bomb", and "threat to the human race". The mass-media coverage is controversial, since the use of such terms has led to concern that it has fostered clickbait or hysterical coverage playing on community fears. Media coverage often uses vivid comparisons, such as sperm counts in other animals. The long-term effects of male infertility have been explored in dystopian fiction such as Children of Men and The Handmaid's Tale.

== Development and history ==
=== 1970s–1980s ===
During the 1970s and 1980s, the first studies were published which observed declines in human semen quality and, later, sperm quantity. One of the earliest studies, published in 1974, noted a reduction in sperm quality (lower sperm concentration and semen volume) and a higher percentage of abnormal sperm. These early studies' methodology has been criticized for sampling bias and the inclusion of men with testicular and fertility issues. Other reports published during the two decades had not found similar declines; a 1982 research paper by Niecheslag et al. concluded that there were no changes in semen quality. The decline in sperm quality reflected a shift in societal patterns of sexual behaviour, widespread recreational drug use, and preferences for marriage and fatherhood later in life.

The World Health Organization published its first laboratory manual for semen analysis in 1980, which sets global standard parameters for the measurement of sperm quality and normality. Limited research in the 1980s found the first indications behind the decline, with links to environmental-toxin exposure and excessive heat in the genital area.

=== 1990s–2000s ===
The 1990s saw significant development in research on male infertility, with reliable results indicating a decline. A 1992 Danish meta-analysis, commonly known as the Carlsen study after its principal author, showed that between 1938 and 1990 a population described as healthy had experienced a significant decrease in sperm count and semen volume. Following this study, other studies supported this thesis. During the late 1990s, the first studies of the social and psychological impact of male infertility were published. Near the end of the decade, the conception technique of intracytoplasmic sperm injection (ICSI, similar to in vitro fertilisation) was introduced.

=== 2010s–present ===
By the 2010s, it was clear that there had been a significant, steady decline in sperm count and semen volume. A 2017 meta-analysis led by Hagai Levine from the Hebrew University reported decreases in sperm concentration of 52.4 percent and in sperm count of 59.3 percent, from 1973 to 2011 in Western countries (Australia, New Zealand, Europe, and North America). Two other studies presented at the 2018 American Society for Reproductive Medicine (ASRM) scientific congress had similar findings: reduced sperm counts and motility during the 2000s. A 2012 paper published by French researchers and Yeshiva University's Institute for Public Health Sciences in the Journal of Human Reproduction studied French males from 1989 to 2005 and concluded that sperm counts and the proportion of normal, motile sperm fell by 32.2 and 8.1 percent, respectively.

Mt. Sinai Medical School epidemiologist Shanna Swan wrote in her 2021 book, Count Down: How Our Modern World Is Threatening Sperm Counts, Altering Male and Female Reproductive Development, and Imperiling the Future of the Human Race, "If you look at the curve on sperm count and project it forward – which is always risky – it reaches zero in 2045".

Another meta-analysis in 2022, again led by Hagai Levine, reported that sperm concentration declined by 53.3 percent and sperm count by 56.3 percent in Western countries (1973-2015), and by 27.6 and 24.7 percent respectively, in non-Western countries (1986-2018). Moreover, when the dataset was restricted to more recent studies (post-2000), the declines in semen parameters became steeper. For instance, the decline in worldwide sperm concentration doubled, suggesting that these declines may be accelerating.

A 2022 review by prominent researchers in the field of human fertility suggested that increasing industrialisation over the 20th century has led to an increase in exposure to endocrine disrupting chemicals, which may have contributed to the decline in sperm counts. Other research published in 2023 has linked the change in diet associated with industrialisation, termed the nutrition transition, to declining sperm counts, estimating that the transition from an unprocessed to modern processed diet may account for up to 30 percent of the decline in sperm counts.

== Impacts and responses ==
Male fertility issues have been overlooked in the past, and fertility research has focused on women. Sociologists studying male infertility have found that awareness has shifted societal attitudes on fertility and gender more toward men.

Believers that male infertility has reached crisis proportions say that more must be done to remediate potential causes of male infertility, such as lifestyle factors and exposure to toxic environmental chemicals. They advocate modernizing health care with improved practices and increased funding.

Social programs to alleviate the impact of the crisis have been implemented as part of men's reproductive health. Events such as International Men's Health Week and Movember advocate reforms to address the crisis.

The Australian federal government funded the Healthy Male, a program to support male reproductive health and fertility, and issued a A$3 million research grant to Andrology Australia. Other national-government responses include recommendations by the UK's National Health Service for a healthy lifestyle and loose-fitting underwear to improve fertility.

== Criticism ==
Critics of labeling male infertility a crisis have cited research which has partially stigmatized men, and say that male infertility has inadvertently been conflated with mental health and social vulnerability. However, no direct evidence supports such stigmatization. Gannon et al. wrote in 2004 that media coverage of the crisis has posed it as a threat to hegemonic masculinity.

Scientists disagree on the impact of observed fertility declines to date, and sperm counts remain above the 15 million considered to be below normal by the World Health Organization. The issue of most concern is reducing average abnormal-sperm counts. Health practitioners and fertility doctors who work in the field are skeptical about a crisis in male fertility, since they had not observed a dramatic decline first-hand; a disconnect exists between what has been observed in published research and what is seen in clinical practice.

It has also been pointed out that sexual and masturbatory cultural shifts may be the true driver of the phenomenon, as more frequent ejaculation quickly reduces sperm counts.

Andrologists have said that not enough research has been conducted on male fertility to address the crisis effectively. Existing treatments, such as assisted reproductive technology, are difficult to access and may have severe complications.

== See also ==
- Sub-replacement fertility
- Ovum quality
- Semen quality
