= Genetics of infertility =

About 10–15% of human couples are infertile, unable to conceive. In approximately in half of these cases, the underlying cause is related to the male. The underlying causative factors in the male infertility can be attributed to environmental toxins, systemic disorders such as, hypothalamic–pituitary disease, testicular cancers and germ-cell aplasia. Genetic factors including aneuploidies and single-gene mutations are also contributed to the male infertility. Patients with nonobstructive azoospermia or oligozoospermia show microdeletions in the long arm of the Y chromosome and/or chromosomal abnormalities, each with the respective frequency of 9.7% and 13%. A large percentage of human male infertility is estimated to be caused by mutations in genes involved in primary or secondary spermatogenesis and sperm quality and function. Single-gene defects are the focus of most research carried out in this field.

NR5A1 mutations are associated with male infertility, suggesting the possibility that these mutations cause the infertility. However, it is possible that these mutations individually have no major effect and only contribute to the male infertility by collaboration with other contributors such as environmental factors and other genomics variants. Vice versa, existence of the other alleles could reduce the phenotypic effects of impaired NR5A1 proteins and attenuate the expression of abnormal phenotypes and manifest male infertility solely.

== NR5A1 roles in sex development and related disorders ==
Nuclear receptor subfamily 5 group A member 1 (NR5A1), also known as SF1 or Ad4BP (MIM 184757), is located on the long arm of chromosome 9 (9q33.3). The NR5A1 is an orphan nuclear receptor that was first identified following the search for a common regulator of the cytochrome P450 steroid hydroxylase enzyme family. This receptor is a pivotal transcriptional regulator of an array of genes involved in reproduction, steroidogenesis and male sexual differentiation and also plays a crucial role in adrenal gland formation in both sexes. NR5A1 regulates the Müllerian inhibitory substance by binding to a conserved upstream regulatory element and directly participates in the process of mammalian sex determination through Müllerian duct regression. Targeted disruption of NR5A1 (Ftzf1) in mice results in gonadal and adrenal agenesis, persistence of Müllerian structures and abnormalities of the hypothalamus and pituitary gonadotropes. Heterozygous animals demonstrate a milder phenotype including an impaired adrenal stress response and reduced testicular size. In humans, NR5A1 mutations were first described in patients with 46, XY karyotype and disorders of sex development (DSD), Müllerian structures and primary adrenal failure (MIM 612965). After that, heterozygous NR5A1 mutations were described in seven patients showing 46, XY karyotype and ambiguous genitalia, gonadal dysgenesis, but no adrenal insufficiency. Since then, studies have confirmed that mutations in NR5A1 in patients with 46, XY karyotype cause severe underandrogenisation, but no adrenal insufficiency, establishing dynamic and dosage-dependent actions for NR5A1. Subsequent studies revealed that NR5A1 heterozygous mutations cause primary ovarian insufficiency (MIM 612964).

== NR5A1 new roles in fertility and infertility ==
Recently, NR5A1 mutations have been related to human male infertility (MIM 613957). These findings substantially increase the number of NR5A1 mutations reported in humans and show that mutations in NR5A1 can be found in patients with a wide range of phenotypic features, ranging from 46,XY sex reversal with primary adrenal failure to male infertility. For the first time, Bashamboo et al. (2010) conducted a study on the nonobstructive infertile men (a non-Caucasian mixed ancestry n = 315), which resulted in the report of all missense mutations in the NR5A1 gene with 4% frequency. Functional studies of the missense mutations revealed impaired transcriptional activation of NR5A1-responsive target genes. Subsequently, three missense mutations were identified as associated with and most likely the cause of the male infertility, according to computational analyses. The study indicated that the mutation frequency is below 1% (Caucasian German origin, n = 488). In another study the coding sequence of NR5A1 has been analysed in a cohort of 90 well-characterised idiopathic Iranian azoospermic infertile men versus 112 fertile men. Heterozygous NR5A1 mutations were found in 2 of 90 (2.2%) of cases. These two patients harboured missense mutations within the hinge region (p.P97T) and ligand-binding domain (p.E237K) of the NR5A1 protein.

=== Small supernumerary marker chromosomes and infertility ===
Small supernumerary marker chromosome (sSMCs) are extra chromosomes consisting of parts of virtually any other chromosome(s). By definition, they are smaller than one of the smaller chromosomes, chromosome 20. sSMCs typically develop in individuals as a result of abnormal chromosomal events occurring in one of their parent's eggs, sperms, or zygotes but in less common cases are directly inherited from a parent carrier of the sSMC. sSMCs occur in 0.125% of all infertility cases, are 7.5-fold more common in men, and in women are often associated with ovarian failure. The sSMCs associated with infertility can consist of parts of virtually any other chromosome. While only a small percentage of these sSMCs have had their genetic material defined, those that have include sSMCs containing: a) band 11.1 from the short arm of chromosome 15 (notated as (15)q11.1)(this sSMC is associated with premature ovarian failure); b) band ll.2 from the short arm of chromosome 13 (notated as (13)q11.2)(this sSMC is associated with oligoasthenoteratozoospermia, i.e. oligozoospermia [low sperm count], teratozoospermia [presence of sperm with abnormal shapes], and asthenozoospermia [sperm with reduced motility]); c) band 11 from the short arm of chromosome 14 (notated as (14)q11.1)(this sCMC is associated with otherwise uncharacterized infertility; and d) band 11 on the short arm of chromosome 22 notated as (22)q11)(this sSMC is associated with repeated abortions).

== See also ==
- Female infertility
