= Infertility =

Inability to reproduce

- Specialty: Urology, gynecology
- Causes: Common in females: anovulation, blocked fallopian tube, hormonal imbalance Common in males: low sperm count, abnormal sperm morphology
- Frequency: 113 million (2015)

In biology, infertility is the inability of a male and female organism to reproduce. It is usually not the natural state of a healthy organism that has reached sexual maturity. As a medical term, infertility does not apply before and after the normal period of natural, age-dependent reproductive function: in children before puberty, or in women after menopause.

In humans, infertility is defined as the inability to become pregnant after at least one year of unprotected and regular sexual intercourse involving a male and female partner. There are many causes of infertility, including some that medical intervention can treat. Estimates from 1997, suggest that worldwide about five percent of all heterosexual couples have an unresolved problem with infertility. That figure has been on the rise, with the World Health Organization (WHO) reporting in 2023 that about 17.5% of people experience infertility during their lifetime, while prevalence at a given time point is 12.6%. Many more couples, however, experience involuntary childlessness for at least one year, with estimates ranging from 12% to 28%.

Male infertility is responsible for 20–30% of infertility cases, while 20–35% are due to female infertility, and 25–40% are due to combined problems in both partners. In 10–20% of cases, no cause is found.

The most common causes of female infertility are hormonal in nature, including low estrogen, imbalanced gonadotropin-releasing hormone (GnRH) secretion, polyendocrine metabolic ovarian syndrome (PMOS), and aging, which generally manifests in sparse or absent menstrual periods leading up to menopause. As women age, the number of ovarian follicles and oocytes (immature eggs) decline, leading to a reduced ovarian reserve. Some women undergo primary ovarian insufficiency (premature menopause) or the loss of ovarian function before age 40, leading to infertility. 85% of infertile couples have an identifiable cause, and 15% is designated unexplained infertility. Of the 85% of identified infertility, 25% is due to disordered ovulation (of which 70% of the cases are due to PMOS). Tubal infertility (structural issues with the fallopian tubes) is responsible for 11–67% of infertility in women of childbearing age, with the large range in prevalence due to different populations studied. Endometriosis, the presence of endometrial tissue (which normally lines the uterus) outside of the uterus, accounts for 25–40% of female infertility.

During the menstrual cycle, there is a limited physiological fertile window of up to seven days before and during ovulation, when conception may be possible. Both the length of the menstrual cycle and the length of the fertile window are highly variable. Fertility awareness methods are used to discern when these changes occur by tracking changes in cervical mucus, basal body temperature, or hormone measurements.

Male infertility is most commonly due to deficiencies in the semen, and semen quality is used as a surrogate measure of male fecundity. Male infertility may also be due to retrograde ejaculation, low testosterone, functional azoospermia (in which sperm is not produced or not produced in enough numbers) and obstructive azoospermia in which the pathway for the sperm (such as the vas deferens) is obstructed.

== Definition ==
"Demographers tend to define infertility as childlessness in a population of women of reproductive age." The epidemiological definition refers to "trying for" or "time to" a pregnancy, generally in a population of women exposed to a probability of conception. Currently, female fertility normally peaks in young adulthood. It diminishes after age 35, with pregnancy occurring rarely after age 50. A female is most fertile within 24 hours of ovulation. Male fertility peaks usually in young adulthood and declines after age 40.

The time needed to pass (during which the couple tries to conceive) for that couple to be diagnosed with infertility differs between different organizations. Existing definitions of infertility lack uniformity, rendering comparisons in prevalence between countries or over time problematic. Therefore, data estimating the prevalence of infertility cited by various sources differ significantly. A couple that tries unsuccessfully to have a child after a certain period (often a short period, but definitions vary) is sometimes said to be subfertile, meaning less fertile than a typical couple. Both infertility and subfertility are defined similarly and often used interchangeably. Subfertility is the delay in conceiving within six to twelve months, whereas infertility is the inability to conceive naturally within a full year.

=== World Health Organization ===
The World Health Organization defines infertility as follows:

Infertility is "a disease of the reproductive system defined by the failure to achieve a clinical pregnancy after 12 months or more of regular unprotected sexual intercourse (and there is no other reason, such as breastfeeding or postpartum amenorrhoea). Primary infertility is infertility in a couple who have never had a child. Secondary infertility is the failure to conceive following a previous pregnancy. Infertility may be caused by infection in the man or woman, but often there is no obvious underlying cause."

The World Health Organization also adds that "women whose pregnancy spontaneously miscarries, or whose pregnancy results in a stillborn child, without ever having had a live birth, would present with primarily infertility".

=== United States ===
One definition of infertility that is frequently used in the United States by reproductive endocrinologists, doctors who specialize in infertility, to consider a couple eligible for treatment is:

- A woman under 35 has not conceived after 12 months of contraceptive-free sexual intercourse.
- A woman over 35 has not conceived after 6 months of contraceptive-free sexual intercourse.

=== United Kingdom ===
In the UK, previous NICE guidelines defined infertility as failure to conceive after regular unprotected sexual intercourse for two years in the absence of known reproductive pathology. Updated NICE guidelines do not include a specific definition, but recommend that "A woman of reproductive age who has not conceived after 1 year of unprotected vaginal sexual intercourse, in the absence of any known cause of infertility, should be offered further clinical assessment and investigation along with her partner, with earlier referral to a specialist if the woman is over 36 years of age."

=== Africa ===
Infertility is used interchangeably with childlessness and is defined as the inability to conceive after twelve months of regular sexual intercourse without use of contraception. While some parts of sub-Saharan Africa experience an infertility rate of 30%, infertility is associated with negative perceptions. Socially constructed beliefs imply that infertility is due to supernatural repercussions for wrongdoings across many African countries, or caused by the use of witchcraft. Women facing infertility are often blamed and prone to abortion and contraception accusations, in some contexts seen as "incomplete" and "failures" due to societal and familial expectations.

=== Other definitions ===
Researchers commonly base demographic studies on infertility prevalence over five years.

== Causes ==
Male infertility is responsible for 20–30% of infertility cases, while 20–35% are due to female infertility, and 25–40% are due to combined problems in both partners. In 10–20% of cases, no cause is found. The most common cause of female infertility is abnormal ovulation, usually manifested by scanty or absent menstrual periods. Male infertility is most commonly due to deficiencies in the semen, and semen quality is used as a surrogate measure of male fecundity.

=== Before puberty ===
Before puberty, humans are naturally incapable of reproduction; their gonads have not yet developed the gametes required to reproduce: boys' testicles have not developed the sperm cells required to impregnate a female; girls have not begun the process of ovulation which activates the fertility of their egg cells (ovulation is confirmed by the first menstrual cycle, known as menarche, which signals the biological possibility of pregnancy). The lack of fertility in children is commonly referred to as prepubescence (or being prepubescent, an adjective used to also refer to humans without secondary sex characteristics).

The absence of fertility in children is considered a natural part of human growth and child development, as the hypothalamus in their brain is still underdeveloped and cannot release the hormones required to activate the gonads' gametes. Fertility in children before the ages of eight or nine is considered a disease known as precocious puberty. This disease is usually triggered by a brain tumor or other related injury.

=== Delayed puberty ===
Delayed puberty, puberty absent past or occurring later than the average onset (between the ages of ten and fourteen), may be a cause of infertility. In the United States, girls are considered to have delayed puberty if they have not started menstruating by age 16 (alongside lacking breast development by age 13). Boys are considered to have delayed puberty if they lack enlargement of the testicles by age 14. Delayed puberty affects about 2% of adolescents.

Most commonly, puberty may be delayed for several years and still occur normally, in which case it is considered a constitutional delay of growth and puberty, a common variation of healthy physical development. Delay of puberty may also occur due to various causes such as malnutrition, various systemic diseases, or defects of the reproductive system (hypogonadism) or the body's responsiveness to sex hormones.

=== Nutrient Deficiencies ===
==== Iodine ====
Iodine deficiencies affect nearly 95% of the population worldwide and can be seen in fertility complications when examining Japan and China. Because of their lower infant mortality rates than the rest of the world, high iodine intake through cultural foods is associated with the cause. Iodine directly affects the ovaries, which have the second-highest iodine concentrations after the thyroid. Hypothyroidism is associated with iodine deficiencies, which are attributed to increased risk for miscarriages and fertility complications. Follicular maturation can be affected directly and can be linked to the development of PCOS/PMOS and spontaneous abortions. A study in Finland found that iodine deficiencies led to anovulation in cows, but adding iodine back into their diet promoted fertility and ovulation and lessened the occurrence of retained placenta. Iodine deficiencies are also associated with fetal development in utero, causing cretinism in extreme deficiencies and milder defects in the development of cognitive and motor skills.

==== Selenium ====
Selenium is a micronutrient that has been associated with testicular development, spermatogenesis, and sperm mobility in men, and neutralizing Reactive Oxygen Species (ROS) that, when in excess, can have negative implications on egg quality. Men supplemented with selenium and vitamin E experienced increased sperm count, development, and mobility. Lower levels of selenium were found in the follicular fluid of women who had unexplained fertility when compared to women who had different causes for infertility. Selenium deficiencies in maternity can lead to miscarriages, damage to neural and immune function, gestational complications, and low birth weight.

==== Omega-3 ====
Omega-3 and Omega-6 fatty acids are not generated within the body and are obtained through diet, contributing to growth, brain and eye development, and the development of the reproductive system. The imbalance of the overconsumption of omega-6 (found in soybean/ vegetable oil) and the underconsumption of omega-3 (Alpha-linolenic acid [ALA] obtained from plants, Docosahexaenoic Acid [DHA] and eicosapentaenoic acid [EPA] obtained from fish and seafood) is attributed to weight gain and obesity, which negatively influences fertility. Omega-3, more specifically DHA, contributes to the formation and structure of the sperm's anatomy. Excess saturated and trans-fat intake decreases the amount of DHA in the sperm and can lead to deficiencies and infertility in men. Balanced and regular levels of omega-3 and omega-6 are found to improve sperm count in cases of oligospermia and reduce potential DNA damage caused by oxidative stress from ROS, increasing the potential for the sperm to penetrate and fuse with the oocyte. The use of fish oil supplements that include EPA and DHA was found to be associated with an increased semen volume, sperm count, and testes size as well as higher free testosterone levels and lower luteinizing hormone levels. Omega-3 fatty acids assist in hormone regulation and inflammation control and have been found to increase estradiol and embryo quality in women. Omega-3 supplements were shown to increase fertility in women diagnosed with PCOS/PMOS, representing potential deficiencies contributing to infertility in this population.

==== Magnesium ====
Magnesium is an important mineral in hormone regulation, playing a role in the development and function of the testes and ovaries. Magnesium is necessary for the production of sex hormones, with deficiencies associated with preeclampsia and gestational diabetes, and can cause irregular menstruation and ovulation in women and lower sperm count and quality in men.

=== Immune infertility ===
Antisperm antibodies (ASA) have been considered as an infertility cause in around 10–30% of infertile couples. In both men and women, ASA production is directed against surface antigens on sperm, which can interfere with sperm motility and transport through the female reproductive tract, inhibiting capacitation and acrosome reaction, impaired fertilization, influence on the implantation process, and impaired growth and development of the embryo. The antibodies are classified into different groups: IgA, IgG, and IgM. They also differ in the location of the spermatozoon they bind to (head, midpiece, tail). Factors contributing to the formation of antisperm antibodies in women are disturbance of normal immunoregulatory mechanisms, infection, violation of the integrity of the mucous membranes, rape, and unprotected oral or anal sex. Risk factors for the formation of antisperm antibodies in men include the breakdown of the blood‑testis barrier, trauma and surgery, orchitis, varicocele, infections, prostatitis, testicular cancer, failure of immunosuppression and unprotected receptive anal or oral sex with men.

=== Sexually transmitted infections ===
Diseases such as chlamydia and gonorrhea can also cause infertility due to internal scarring (fallopian tube obstruction). Infections with the following sexually transmitted pathogens hurt fertility: Chlamydia trachomatis and Neisseria gonorrhoeae. There is a consistent association of Mycoplasma genitalium infection and female reproductive tract syndromes. M. genitalium infection is associated with an increased risk of infertility.

=== Genetics ===
Mutations to the NR5A1 gene encoding steroidogenic factor 1 (SF-1) have been found in a small subset of men with non-obstructive male factor infertility, where the cause is unknown. Results of one study investigating a cohort of 315 men revealed changes within the hinge region of SF-1 and no rare allelic variants in fertile control men. Affected individuals displayed more severe forms of infertility such as azoospermia and severe oligozoospermia.

Small supernumerary marker chromosomes are abnormal extra chromosomes; they are three times more likely to occur in infertile individuals and account for 0.125% of all infertility cases. See Infertility associated with small supernumerary marker chromosomes and Genetics of infertility#Small supernumerary marker chromosomes and infertility.

=== Pollution ===
Environmental pollution in both indoor and outdoor air has been linked to negative effects on reproduction. Total fertility rates (TFRs) have fallen worldwide in all recorded countries since the early 1960s. Research has consistently shown that pollution interferes with all aspects of sexual reproduction from male and female fertility to fetal development, birth outcomes, and long-term health of offspring. The risk of adverse birth outcomes such as miscarriage, stillbirth, preterm birth, low birth weight and birth defects increase when pregnant women are exposed to air pollution.

Tobacco smokers are 60% more likely to be infertile than non-smokers. Pregnant women are advised to avoid tobacco and cannabis smoking, second-hand smoke, and e-cigarettes. Many pollutants are linked to the burning of fossil fuels, through vehicle use, heating and cooking. Air pollution can contain particulate matter, endocrine-disrupting chemicals and microplastics that disrupt fertility and reproductive health. Toxins such as glues, volatile organic solvents or silicones, flame retardants, chemical dusts, polychlorinated biphenyls, and pesticides are harmful to fertility and reproduction. Potential mechanisms of action by toxic environmental chemicals include oxidative stress, inflammation, changes in placental function, endocrine disruption, DNA damage and long-term genetic alterations.

Air pollution is a potentially modifiable risk factor for infertility. Steps can be taken to minimize exposures such as avoiding smoking, reducing dust, using glass or metal instead of plastics, carefully selecting cleaning products and cosmetics, and exercising away from heavy traffic routes.

=== Other causes ===
Factors that can cause male as well as female infertility include:

- Diseases
  - Diabetes mellitus, thyroid disorders, undiagnosed and untreated coeliac disease, adrenal disease
- Hypothalamic–pituitary factors
  - Hyperprolactinemia
  - Hypopituitarism
  - The presence of anti-thyroid antibodies is associated with an increased risk of unexplained subfertility with an odds ratio of 1.5 and 95% confidence interval of 1.1–2.0.
- Body mass, the BMI (body mass index) (either being too high or too low), may be a contributor to infertility.
  - Obesity: Obesity can have a significant impact on male and female fertility. In females, a BMI above 27 increases the risk of infertility 3-fold. Obese women have a higher rate of recurrent, early miscarriage compared to non-obese women. In males, an increase in BMI above 30 may be associated with reduced sperm quality and impaired spermatogenesis leading to infertility. In males, a high BMI is also associated with low testosterone levels (secondary hypogonadism) and erectile dysfunction, which contributes to infertility.
  - Low weight: females with a very low BMI may have infertility. Common causes of low BMI leading to infertility include anorexia nervosa and other eating disorders, excessive exercise, or relative energy deficiency in sport. Infertility in females with a low BMI is usually due to functional hypothalamic amenorrhea due to stress-induced inhibition of the hypothalamic–pituitary–ovarian axis.

=== Females ===
For a woman to conceive, certain things have to happen: vaginal intercourse must take place around the time when an egg is released from her ovary; the system that produces eggs has to be working at optimum levels; and her hormones must be balanced.

For women, problems with fertilization arise mainly from either structural problems in the fallopian tube or uterus, or problems releasing eggs. Infertility may be caused by blockage of the fallopian tube due to malformations, infections such as chlamydia, or scar tissue. For example, endometriosis can cause infertility with the growth of endometrial tissue in the fallopian tubes or around the ovaries. Endometriosis is usually more common in women in their mid-twenties and older, especially when childbirth has been postponed.

Another major cause of infertility in women may be the inability to ovulate. This is usually related to low levels of the sex hormone estrogen, as well as imbalanced GnRH secretion. Ovulatory disorders make up 25% of the known causes of female infertility.

Oligo-ovulation or anovulation results in infertility because no oocyte will be released monthly. In the absence of an oocyte, there is no opportunity for fertilization and pregnancy. The World Health Organization subdivided ovulatory disorders into four classes:

- Hypogonadotropic hypogonadal anovulation: i.e., hypothalamic amenorrhea
- Normogonadotropic normoestrogenic anovulation: i.e., polyendocrine metabolic ovarian syndrome (PMOS)
- Hypergonadotropic hypoestrogenic anovulation: i.e., premature ovarian failure
- Hyperprolactinemic anovulation: i.e., pituitary adenoma

Malformation of the eggs themselves may complicate conception. For example, polyendocrine metabolic ovarian syndrome (PMOS) is when the eggs only partially develop within the ovary, and there is an excess of male hormones. Some women are infertile because their ovaries do not mature and release eggs. In this case, synthetic FSH by injection or Clomid (clomiphene citrate) via a pill can be given to stimulate follicular maturation in the ovaries.

Other factors that can affect a woman's chances of conceiving include being overweight or underweight, or her age as female fertility declines after the age of 30.

Sometimes it can be a combination of factors, and sometimes a clear cause is never established.

Common causes of infertility in females include:

- hormone-related ovulation problems (e.g., PMOS, the leading reason why women present to fertility clinics due to anovulatory infertility)
- tubal blockage
- pelvic inflammatory disease caused by infections like tuberculosis
- age-related factors
- uterine problems
- previous tubal ligation
- endometriosis
- advanced maternal age
- immune infertility

=== Males ===
Male infertility is defined as the inability of a male to make a fertile female pregnant, for a minimum of at least one year of unprotected intercourse. Male infertility is estimated to contribute to 35% of infertility in couples. There are multiple causes for male infertility including endocrine disorders (usually due to hypogonadism) at an estimated 2% to 5%, sperm transport disorders at 5%, primary testicular defects (which includes abnormal sperm parameters without any identifiable cause) at 65% to 80% and idiopathic (where an infertile male has normal sperm and semen parameters) at 10% to 20%.

The main cause of male infertility is low semen quality. In men who have the necessary reproductive organs to procreate, infertility can be caused by low sperm count due to endocrine problems, drugs, radiation, or infection. There may be testicular malformations, hormone imbalance, or blockage of the man's duct system. Although many of these can be treated through surgery or hormonal substitutions, some may be indefinite. Infertility associated with viable, but immotile sperm may be caused by primary ciliary dyskinesia. The sperm must provide the zygote with DNA, centrioles, and an activation factor for the embryo to develop. A defect in any of these sperm structures may result in infertility that will not be detected by semen analysis. Antisperm antibodies cause immune infertility. Cystic fibrosis can lead to infertility in men by blocking the vas deferens.

Adeno-associated virus infection has been linked to poor sperm quality and may contribute to male infertility, based on small observational studies.

=== Unexplained infertility ===
In the US, up to 15% of infertile couples have unexplained infertility, in which no identifiable cause is found. Polymorphisms in folate pathway genes may be a cause for fertility complications in some women with unexplained infertility. Epigenetic modifications in sperm may also be responsible for unexplained infertility.

=== In animals ===
Hybrid animals may have sex-linked infertility, as observed in Haldane's Rule. This phenomenon is likely due to harmful, recessive genes being expressed in individuals with different chromosomes, which reduces fitness and causes infertility.

Nutrient consumption may alter fertility in bulls. The maternal environment in utero for male bulls can influence their future fertility due to epigenetics. Viral, bacterial, and parasitic infections can cause infertility in bulls, with BoHV-1, C. fetus, T. foetus, BVDV, Ureaplasma spp., and Mycoplasma spp being recognized as common causes of infertility. Heat stress caused by hyperthermia in summer months can disrupt sex hormone homeostasis in cows, lowering follicular capacity and delaying ovulation.

In goats and sheep, malnutrition during breeding can cause adverse effects on fertility rates. Poor hygiene and excessive stress can lessen fertility, while extreme cold or warm climates can also have negative implications.

== Diagnosis ==
If both partners are young and healthy and have been trying to conceive for one year without success, a visit to a physician or women's health nurse practitioner (WHNP) could help to highlight potential medical problems earlier rather than later. The doctor or WHNP may be able to suggest lifestyle changes to increase the chances of conceiving.

However, there are instances where couples should seek reproductive counseling after only 6 months of trying for a pregnancy:

- The woman is over 35 years old.
- The woman has a history of endometriosis.
- The woman has infrequent or irregular menses.
- There is a male factor involved.

A doctor or WHNP takes a medical history and gives a physical examination. They can also carry out some basic tests on both partners to see if there is an identifiable reason for not having achieved a pregnancy. Among these tests, blood tests are common and may include serologies to detect infections such as hepatitis B (HBV), hepatitis C (HCV), HIV, syphilis, and rubella. Optional tests like karyotypes can also be performed. For females, specific tests might include measuring antimüllerian hormone (AMH) to assess ovarian reserve, thyroid-stimulating hormone (TSH), prolactin (PRL), and vitamin D levels, which can influence fertility. If necessary, they refer patients to a fertility clinic or local hospital for more specialized tests. The results of these tests help determine the best fertility treatment.

== Treatment ==
Treatment depends on the cause of infertility, but may include counselling, fertility treatments, which include in vitro fertilization. According to ESHRE recommendations, couples with an estimated live birth rate of 40% or higher per year are encouraged to continue aiming for a spontaneous pregnancy. Drugs used include clomiphene citrate, human menopausal gonadotropin (hMG), follicle-stimulating hormone (FSH), human chorionic gonadotropin (hCG), gonadotropin-releasing hormone (GnRH) analogues, and aromatase inhibitors.

=== Medical treatments ===
Clomiphene is a selective estrogen receptor modulator used to induce ovulation. It works by blocking the negative feedback from estrogen, creating a gonadotropin releasing hormone (GnRH) increase, which causes the release of luteinizing hormone (LH) and follicle-stimulating hormone (FSH) from the anterior pituitary. FSH and LH act on the ovaries to increase follicle growth and lead to ovulation. Letrozole is an aromatase inhibitor which reduces estradiol levels and increases levels of FSH and LH, which can stimulate ovarian follicle maturation and ovulation. Letrozole is the preferred treatment in those with infertility due to PMOS and is associated with a higher pregnancy rate than other treatments. Both clomiphene and letrozole have a risk of a multiple gestation pregnancy, with the risk being less than 10%. Those with hypogonadotropic hypogonadism require pulsatile GnRH therapy, which is associated with a 93-100% pregnancy rate after 6 months of therapy. The risk of a multiple gestation pregnancy with gonadotropins is 36%. Ovarian stimulation with clomiphene, aromatase inhibitors, or gonadotropins (especially when combined with intrauterine insemination) have a risk of ovarian hyperstimulation syndrome which may occur in 1-5% of cycles and presents as ascites, electrolyte abnormalities and blood clots.

Fertility treatments or medications do not increase the risk of breast, ovarian, or endometrial cancers.

Metformin does not increase the rate of live births in those with infertility (including in those with polyendocrine metabolic ovarian syndrome (PMOS)), and its use is not recommended.

In some cases, in vitro fertilisation (IVF) is used, in which induced ovarian follicle stimulation is followed by the extraction of oocytes from the ovaries. The oocytes are then fertilized in vitro by sperm using Intracytoplasmic sperm injection (ICSI), and the fertilized eggs are reintroduced into the uterus in a procedure called embryo transfer. ICSI was first developed in 1978 by Robert Edwards and Patrick Steptoe.

Ovarian stimulation (such as with clomiphene) combined with in-vitro fertilization or intra-uterine insemination has lower success rates with increasing age.

Sperm or oocyte donors with in vitro fertilization and gestational carriers are sometimes used for gay couples, those with severe medical conditions that make pregnancy dangerous or preclude pregnancy, those with severe infertility, or females with a non-functioning uterus.

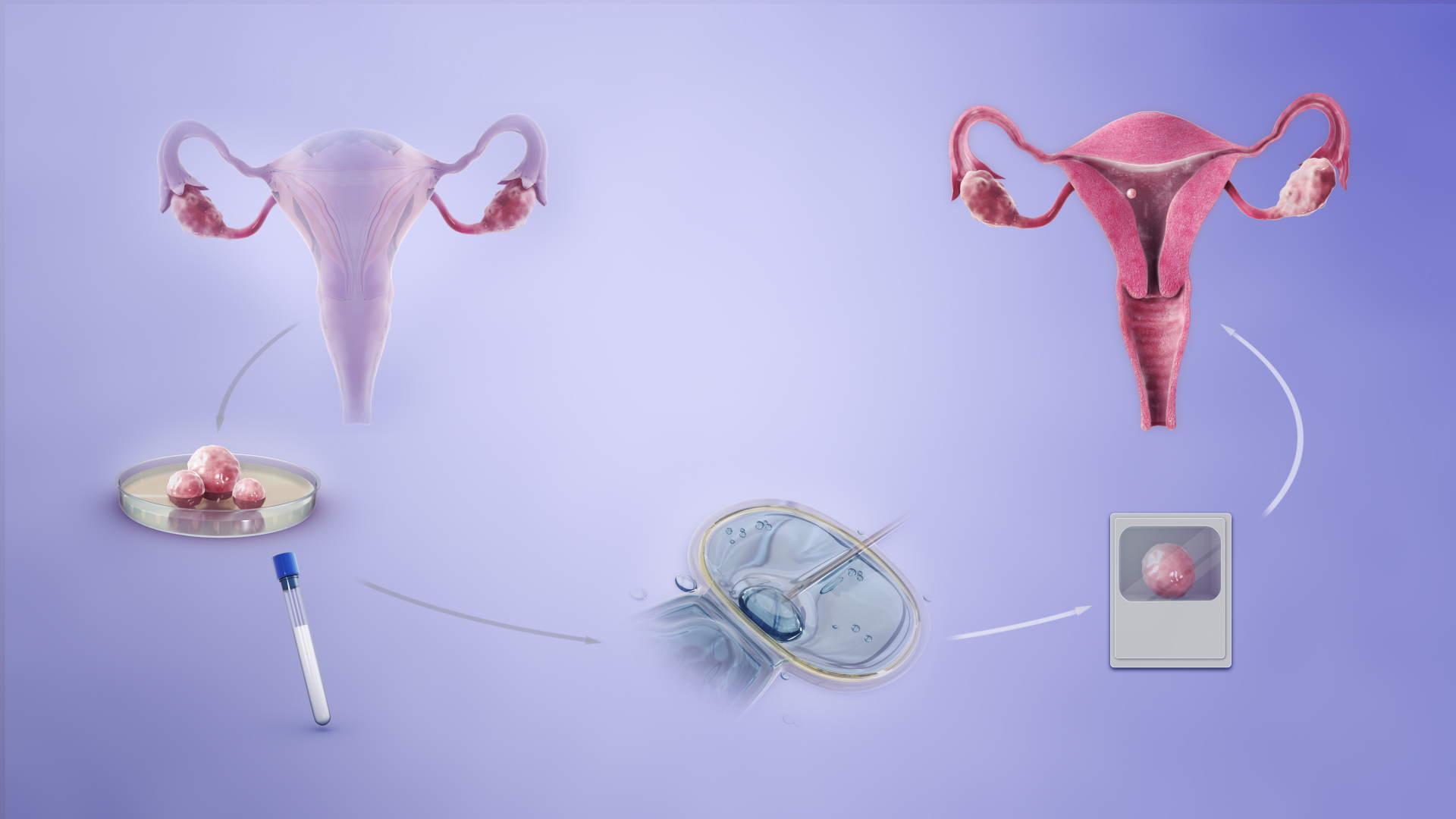
A depiction of the procedure of in-vitro fertilization

=== Tourism ===
Fertility tourism is the act of traveling outside one's home country to gain access to assisted reproductive technology (ART) that may not be accessible within some countries due to cost, wait lists, regulations, laws preventing access to care, and lack of technological advancements and safety of care. ART tourism expands access to surrogacy, egg and sperm donations, and in vitro fertilization (IVF) treatments that may be unavailable and require international travel to receive them. "Reproductive exile" is a term seen as a realistic explanation for travel, with inequalities based on race, gender, class, ethnicity, and government policy encouraging motivations to participate in fertility tourism.

=== Stem cell therapy ===
Several experimental treatments related to stem cell therapy are not yet routinely used in reproductive medicine. These treatments may provide the opportunity for a live birth for people who lack gametes and also for same-sex couples and single people who want to have offspring. Theoretically, with this therapy, artificial gametes can be produced in vitro.

- Spermatogonial stem cells transplant takes place in the seminiferous tubule, with the patient experiencing spermatogenesis. This therapy is sometimes used in cancer patients, whose sperm have been destroyed due to the gonadotoxic treatment.
- Ovarian stem cells may be used to generate new oocytes, which can then be implanted in the uterus after in vitro fertilization. This therapy is still in the experimental phase.

== Epidemiology ==
Prevalence of infertility varies depending on the definition, i.e., on the period involved in the failure to conceive.

- Infertility rates have increased by 4% since the 1980s, mostly from problems with fecundity due to an increase in age.
- Fertility problems affect one in seven couples in the UK. Most couples (about 84%) who have regular sexual intercourse (that is, every two to three days) and who do not use contraception get pregnant within a year. About 95 out of 100 couples who are trying to get pregnant do so within two years.
- Women become less fertile as they get older. For women aged 35, about 94% who have regular unprotected sexual intercourse get pregnant after three years of trying. For women aged 38, however, only about 77%. The effect of age upon men's fertility is less clear.
- In people going forward for IVF in the UK, roughly half of fertility problems with a diagnosed cause are due to problems with the man, and about half due to problems with the woman. However, about one in five cases of infertility has no diagnosed cause.
- In Britain, male factor infertility accounts for 25% of infertile couples, while 25% remain unexplained. 50% are female causes, with 25% being due to anovulation and 25% tubal problems/other.
- In Sweden, approximately 10% of couples wanting children are infertile. In approximately one-third of these cases, the man is the factor, in one-third the woman is the factor, and in the remaining third the infertility is a product of factors on both parts.
- In many lower-income countries, estimating infertility is difficult due to incomplete information and infertility and childlessness stigmas.
- Data on income-limited individuals, male infertility, and fertility within non-traditional families may be limited due to traditional social norms. Historical data on fertility and infertility are limited, as any form of study or tracking only began in the early 20th century. Per one account, "The invisibility of marginalised social groups in infertility tracking reflects broader social beliefs about who can and should reproduce. The offspring of privileged social groups are seen as a boon to society. The offspring of marginalised groups are perceived as a burden."

== Effects ==
=== Psychological ===
The consequences of infertility are manifold and can include societal repercussions and personal suffering. Advances in assisted reproductive technologies, such as IVF, can offer hope to many couples where treatment is available. Medical coverage and affordability barriers exist. The medicalization of infertility has unwittingly led to a disregard for the emotional responses that couples experience, which include distress, loss of control, stigmatization, and a disruption in the developmental trajectory of adulthood. One of the main challenges in assessing the distress levels in women with infertility is the accuracy of self-report measures. It is possible that women "fake good" to appear mentally healthier than they are. It is also possible that women feel a sense of hopefulness/increased optimism before initiating infertility treatment, which is when most assessments of distress are collected. Some early studies concluded that infertile women did not report any significant differences in symptoms of anxiety and depression compared to fertile women. The further into treatment a patient goes, the more often they display symptoms of depression and anxiety. Patients with one treatment failure had significantly higher levels of anxiety, and patients with two failures experienced more depression when compared with those without a history of treatment. However, it has also been shown that the more depressed the infertile woman, the less likely she is to start infertility treatment and the more likely she is to drop out after only one cycle. Researchers have also shown that, despite a good prognosis and having the finances available to pay for treatment, discontinuation is most often due to psychological reasons. Fertility does not seem to increase when the women takes antioxidants to reduce the oxidative stress brought by the situation.

Infertility may have psychological effects. Parenthood is one of the major transitions in adult life for both men and women. The stress of the non-fulfilment of a wish for a child has been associated with emotional consequences such as anger, depression, anxiety, marital problems, and feelings of worthlessness. Partners may become more anxious to conceive, increasing sexual dysfunction. Marital discord often develops, especially when they are under pressure to make medical decisions. Women trying to conceive often have depression rates similar to those of women who have heart disease or cancer. Emotional stress and marital difficulties are greater in couples where the infertility lies with the man. Male and female partners respond differently to infertility problems. In general, women show higher depression levels than their male partners when dealing with infertility. A possible explanation may be that women feel more responsible and guilty than men during the process of trying to conceive. On the other hand, infertile men experience psychosomatic distress.

=== Social ===
Having a child is considered to be important in most societies. Infertile couples may experience social and family pressure, leading to a feeling of social isolation. Factors of gender, age, religion, and socioeconomic status are important influences. Societal pressures may affect a couple's decision to approach, avoid, or experience an infertility treatment. Moreover, the socioeconomic status influences the psychology of infertile couples: low socioeconomic status is associated with increased chances of developing depression. In many cultures, the inability to conceive bears a stigma. In closed social groups, a degree of rejection (or a sense of being rejected by the couple) may cause considerable anxiety and disappointment. Some respond by actively avoiding the issue altogether.

In the United States, some treatments for infertility, including diagnostic tests, surgery, and therapy for depression, can qualify one for Family and Medical Leave Act leave. It has been suggested that infertility be classified as a form of disability.

=== Sexual ===
Infertility is considered to be a major life crisis, with women experiencing negative mental health outcomes including depression and anxiety, and quality of life decreasing after experiencing infertility. These outcomes can deteriorate self-image, linking infertility stress to marital conflict, lower self-esteem, and lower libido. Infertile men are more likely to experience erectile dysfunction and lack of sexual satisfaction, while infertile women reported dissatisfaction within their relationship and lack of enjoyment in sexual intercourse. Infertility was shown to be attributed to more sexual dysfunction and less sexual gratification within couples.

== Society and culture ==
In the Bible there are numerous references to infertility, and in some cases to its resolution through divine intervention, for example:

- Sarah, wife and half-sister of Abraham, was barren until late in life.
- Rebekah, wife of Isaac, was barren until Isaac's prayers were answered.

Perhaps except for infertility in science fiction, films and other fiction depicting emotional struggles of assisted reproductive technology have had an upswing first in the latter part of the 2000s, although the techniques have been available for decades.

Pixar's Up contains a depiction of infertility in an extended life montage that lasts the first few minutes of the film.

Other individual examples are referred to individual sub-articles of assisted reproductive technology

=== Ethics ===
There are several ethical issues associated with infertility and its treatment.

- High-cost treatments are out of financial reach for some couples.
- Medical and emotional risks imposed on surrogates
  - Financial need can lead to exploitation
- Debate over whether health insurance companies (e.g., in the US) should be required to cover infertility treatment.
- IVF can introduce congenital abnormality risks, and has the potential to cause maternal and fetal complications
- Allocation of medical resources that could be used elsewhere
- The legal status of embryos fertilized in vitro and not transferred in vivo. (See also beginning of pregnancy controversy).
- Opposition to the destruction of embryos not transferred in vivo.
- IVF and other fertility treatments have increased by multiple births, provoking ethical analysis because of the link between multiple pregnancies, premature birth, and a host of health problems.
- Religious leaders' opinions on fertility treatments; for example, the Roman Catholic Church views infertility as a calling to adopt or to use natural treatments (medication, surgery, or cycle charting), and members must reject assisted reproductive technologies.
- Infertility caused by DNA defects on the Y chromosome is passed on from father to son. If natural selection is the primary error correction mechanism that prevents random mutations on the Y chromosome, then fertility treatments for men with abnormal sperm (in particular ICSI) only defer the underlying problem to the next male generation.
- Specific procedures, such as gestational surrogacy, have led to numerous ethical issues, particularly when people living in one country contract for surrogacy in another (transnational surrogacy).

Many countries have special frameworks for dealing with the ethical and social issues around fertility treatment.

- One of the best known is the HFEA, the UK's regulator for fertility treatment and embryo research. This was set up on 1 August 1991 following the report of a commission of enquiry led by Mary Warnock in the 1980s
- A similar model to the HFEA was adopted elsewhere in the European Union. Each country has its own body or bodies responsible for the inspection and licensing of fertility treatment under the EU's Tissues and Cells directive
- Regulatory bodies are also found in Canada and in the State of Victoria in Australia.

== See also ==
- Advanced maternal age
- Age and female fertility
- Antinatalism
- Birth control
- Childlessness
- Conception device
- Kallmann Syndrome
- Klinefelter Syndrome
- Mossman–Pacey paradox
- Oncofertility, fertility in cancer patients
- Pentasomy X
- Pollution and reproduction
- Population control
- Sterility
- Surrogate marriage
- Trisomy X
- Turner Syndrome
- Voluntary childlessness
