= Vasography =

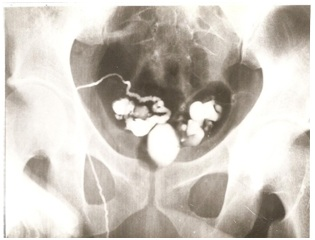
Vasography with a prostatic cyst and seminal vesicles filled with iodinated contrast

Vasography is an X-ray study of the vas deferens to see if there is blockage, oftentimes in the context of male infertility. An incision is made in the scrotum, contrast is injected in the vas deferens, and X-rays are taken from different angles. Thus, it is an invasive procedure and carries risk of iatrogenic scarring and obstruction of the vas. Vasography has traditionally been considered the gold standard imaging modality for evaluating the seminal tract patency.

To avoid performing an extra operation, vasography is encouraged to be done at the time of correction of the obstruction, and thus should not be done as an isolated outpatient procedure.

== History ==
Vasography was first described by Belfield in 1913, where a vasotomy was initially done and the vas deferens was subsequently intubated. After almost 40 years of being overlooked, Boreau revived the procedure in the 1950s. Then, vasography was somewhat overused for various fertility disorders and other diseases such as tuberculosis, prostate cancer, hemospermia, and compressive fibrolipomatosis, without considering the possible risks and complications from the procedure. Today, vasography is used to determine the location of obstruction in azoospermic patients who have demonstrated spermatogenesis by testis biopsy.

== Indications ==
Vasography is absolutely indicated if 1) azoospermia (low sperm) is present, 2) testis biopsy shows complete spermatogenesis and many mature spermatids, and 3) there is at least one palpable vas.

Vasography may be indicated if there is severe oligospermia (few sperm) with a normal testis biopsy, high levels of sperm-bound antibodies, or low semen volume and poor sperm motility.

== Complications ==
- Stricture – multiple attempts at vasography with sharp needles or imprecise closure of the vasography site may lead to stricture and obstruction.
- Injury to the Vasal Blood Supply
- Hematoma
- Sperm granuloma – may be caused by leaky closure of the vasography site and can lead to stricture and obstruction.
