= Male accessory gland infection =

- Other names: Male accessory gland inflammation
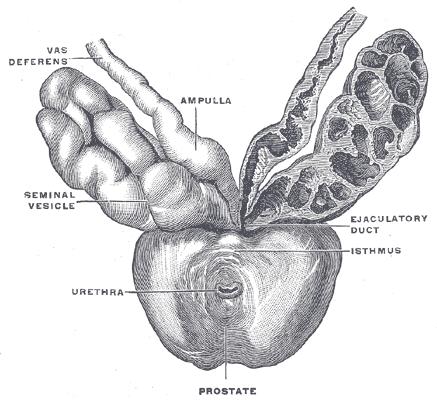
- Prostate with seminal vesicles and seminal ducts, viewed from in front and above
- Specialty: Urology

Male accessory gland infection (MAGI) is a condition with signs of inflammation involving one or more sites in the male genital tract. Diagnosis is made according to parameters defined by the World Health Organization, and it is particularly made in relation to infectious or inflammatory causes of male infertility.

MAGI is typically the result of infections that spread from the urethra, although non-infectious causes can also contribute to the condition.

== Definition ==
Along with testicles (orchitis), MAGI includes infections (bacterial, viral, fungal etc.) involving one or more of the following male genital organs or tracts:

- epididymis (epididymitis)
- vas deferens
- seminal vesicles (seminal vesiculitis)
- prostate gland (prostatitis)
- Cowper's glands
- urethra (urethritis)

== Diagnosis ==
As infection has a negative impact on the secretory function of the accessory glands, findings that could indicate the presence of MAGI include:

- signs of inflammation in a semen analysis (leukocytes ≥ 1 million/mL and/or elastase ≥ 230 ng/mL)
- low semen volume
- elevated semen pH
- low levels of alpha-glucosidase, fructose and zinc

=== WHO criteria ===
MAGI can be diagnosed when there are two or more factors present that meet criteria defined by the World Health Organization (WHO):

Factors	Description	For positive diagnosis
A	History of: urinary tract infection; epididymitis; sexually transmitted infection; Physical signs: thickened or tender epididymis; tender vas deferens; abnormal digital rectal examination (DRE)	(i) Any one Factor A feature plus (ii) one feature from either Factor B or Factor C
B	Prostatic fluid: abnormal expressed prostatic secretion (EPS); abnormal voided urine after prostate massage (VB3)	(i) Either one of the Factor B features plus (ii) one feature from either Factor A or Factor C
C	Semen: leukocytes ≥ 1 million/mL; semen culture with significant growth of pathogenic bacteria; abnormal semen appearance; increased semen viscosity (hyperviscosity); increased pH; abnormal biochemistry of the seminal plasma	Any two Factor C features or (i) any one Factor C feature plus (ii) one feature from either Factor A or Factor B

=== Biomarkers ===
One study has proposed that elevated levels of soluble urokinase-type plasminogen activator receptor (SuPAR) in seminal plasma might be useful as a marker for MAGI.

== Causes ==
The main infectious agents are Enterobacteriaceae (such as Escherichia coli and Klebsiella), Neisseria gonorrhoeae, and Chlamydia trachomatis.

One study has shown that men with MAGI who have lower serum levels of total testosterone tend to have a more complicated form of MAGI, such as involving more than one site, than those with normal levels.

== Complications ==
Potential complications include:

- obstruction of the epididymis
- impairment of spermatogenesis
- impairmentment of sperm function
- induction of sperm auto-antibodies
- dysfunctions of the male accessory glands

These complications can result in sexual dysfunction and male subfertility.
