= Psychological effects of male infertility =

Introduction

Female Reproductive system

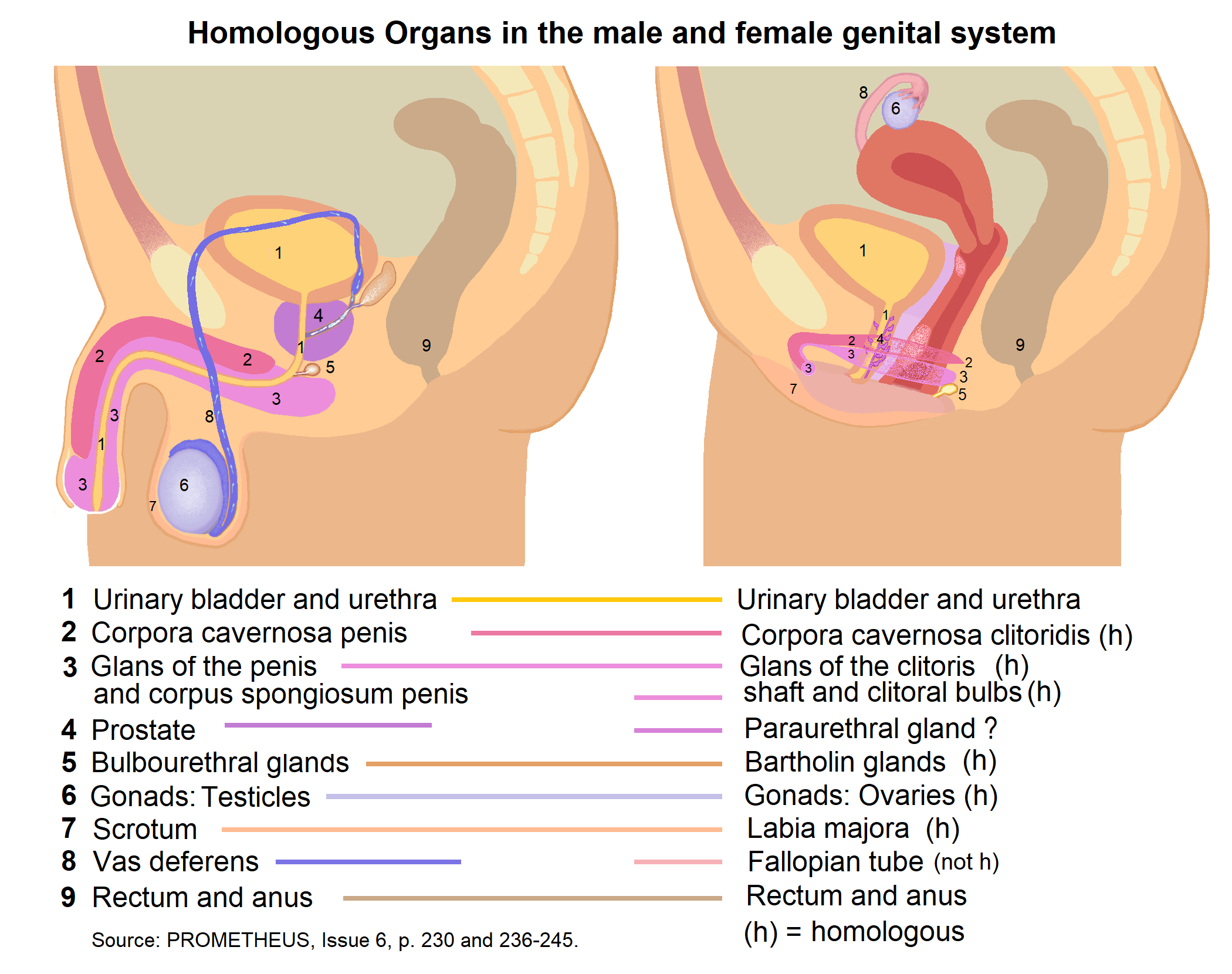
Male Reproductive System

While often overlooked, male infertility has become more prevalent in the 21st century. As 17.5% of the world have reported experiences with infertility, it's one of the main concerning reproductive issues nationwide. Still, studies concerning males are also few in number but have come to the forefront in the past decade starting in 2001. Even so, infertility generally pertains to the inability to conceive within a year time span for both sexes. This can be due to various factors in women and men; for men specifically, it can be related to physical health, fluctuation of hormones, genetic dispositions or ejaculatory dysfunctions. As far as the physical toll, male infertility has shown to cause significant psychological effects too; it has the power to cause low levels of self esteem, emotional distress and feeling of emasculation. According to Dr. Rheta Keylor, of the Massachusetts Institute for Psychoanalysis, suggests that infertility can feel like an "assault on a man's sense of self revives feelings of competition, castration, and experiences of developmental trauma.” Thus, creating a scene of shame for men. Samaira Malik, from the Institute of Work, Health, and Organizations at the University of Nottingham, UK, said, “men are in fact equally affected by the unfulfilled desire for a child but are less open about their feelings.” Therefore, understanding the psychological effects, this has on men, greatly contributes to discovering effective coping strategies to better assist their care.

== Effects of infertility on potency ==
Feelings of stress, depression, guilt, or anxiety in infertile men can cause psychogenic impotence, which heightens the feelings of inadequacy that already accompany infertility. Hence, stress easily activate the hypothalamus-pituitary- adrenal axis which manages the bodies cortizol levels. Though, when cortisol levels are too high it impacts the production of testosterone which can decreases levels of libido; too much cortisol can cause HPA axis dysfunction as well. Addition, other studies suggest that the psychological stress of infertility demonstrate an effect on sperm parameters in significant and demonstrable ways that may further contribute to difficulties with erectile potency; emotional reactions to the infertility may alter or even undermine a previous consolidation of a sense of self as sexually adequate. Infertility weighs on many males' minds; this creates mental instability, which often results in impotence. Psychological causes of impotency may include:

- Clinical depression
- Medications
- Fatigue
- Stress
- Relationship issues
- social interaction

All of the listed issues above can arise as a result of psychological effects of infertility in men.

== Effects of infertility on masculinity ==
The diagnosis of infertility causes many males to question their masculinity; for men are supposed to produce. This perception of masculinity and bearing children can bring feelings of anxiety which is the most common mental health problem associate with infertility. Given that, men may fear permanent infertility, relationship status changes and becoming overly frustrated. Research indicates that "the highest and lowest prevalence of anxiety in these men were 34.9% and 7.08%." This highlight the reason for more research to be conducted. Following, male factor infertility is frequently associated with high levels of social stigma; for example, in a study exploring the views of fertile individuals towards infertile men and women, Miall (1994) found that male infertility was frequently seen as arising from sexual dysfunction and was thus associated with higher levels of stigma than female infertility. Many people assume that infertile men cannot perform sexually. This stigma adds to the heightened insecurities in infertile men. Laura A. Peronace, from the School of Psychology at Cardiff University, said, “Male factor infertility is proposed to have such a social stigma that it produces stress, and a culture of secrecy and protectiveness to the extent that women sometimes even take the blame for the couple's childlessness.” However, infertile men are likely to be depressive and anxious, and have lower masculinity scores and self-esteem. Often, males do not show emotional stress in attempts to be the emotional stability within the relationship. Men cannot suppress such feelings for long periods of time without repercussions.

== Effects of infertility on sexual adequacy ==
Feelings about fertility and sexual adequacy are interconnected for many men, especially through male factor infertility. Couples with long term infertility, who have faced much treatment failure, report higher levels of depression, low satisfaction with their sex lives, and low levels of well being.” The stigma of male factor infertility described earlier has huge effects on the man. The problems infertile men have with sexual inadequacy stem from social ridicule and resulting low self-esteem. It is estimated that 40% of infertile individuals experience significant emotional distress with possible long-term implications. M.J. Muller, from the University of Mainz, Germany, said, “Sexual dissatisfaction of infertile men could also be related to a withdrawal from sexual activities and hence to even lower chances of conception.” Infertility can plague an individual all of their life. Subjects are infertile if they have unprotected sex for 12 months resulting in no pregnancy. This means that the diagnosed infertility may be temporary and/or reversible.

== Psychological treatment ==
The most prevalent psychological treatment is counseling and marriage therapy. A lot of men believe that there are numerous disincentives to psychological treatment despite its potential benefits, especially for those forms of infertility most linked to psychological and behavioral factors. Men are much less likely to seek out psychological help than women. Men who acknowledge infertility, articulate the sources of their anxiety, express their loss of confidence in sexual adequacy, deal openly with their wives' disappointment and anger, and consciously redefine their male and marital roles show improved sperm counts and may even be more successful at impregnating their wives. There is an important role of psychoanalytic treatment when dealing with male infertility.
