= Testicular dysgenesis syndrome =

- Specialty: Urology

Testicular dysgenesis syndrome (TDS) is a hypothesized male reproduction-related condition characterized by the presence of symptoms and disorders such as hypospadias, cryptorchidism, poor semen quality, and testicular cancer. The concept was first introduced by N.E. Skakkebæk along with the department of Growth and Reproduction at Copenhagen University in a paper in Human Reproduction. The paper suggests the origin and underlying cause of TDS can be detected as early as in fetal life, where environmental and genomic factors could affect the development of the male reproductive system.

== Causes ==
Central to the cause of irreversible TDS are disruptions to early fetal testes development. This has genetic, environmental, and lifestyle components, however the rapid increase in the incidence of the disorders associated with TDS in the last decades indicates that it is under a powerful environmental influence. The fetal origins of TDS are reinforced by the high incidence of TDS disorders found occurring together in one individual.

=== Genetic ===
Many genes have been implicated in the disorders of TDS, with genome wide association studies (GWAS) regularly identifying new gene variants that play a role in abnormal testes development. Some of these are specific to certain disorders, and some are part of a risk factor network that connect TGCC, hypospadias, cryptorchidism, and poor semen quality. The majority of these genes are involved in fetal gonad development. Mutations in androgen receptor genes are highly implicated, as these are involved in penile development, testes descent, and testes development. Testicular germ cell cancer (TGCC) shows a strong genetic disposition, with the most significant gene variants being those linked to gonad formation and germ cell function.

=== Environmental ===
Exposure of a male fetus to substances that disrupt hormone systems, particularly chemicals that inhibit the action of androgens (male sex hormones) during the development of the reproductive system, has been shown to cause many of the characteristic TDS disorders. These include environmental estrogens and anti-androgens found in food and water sources that have been contaminated with synthetic hormones and pesticides used in agriculture. In historical cases, medicines given to pregnant women, like diethylstilbestrol (DES), have caused many of the features of TDS in fetuses exposed to this chemical during gestation. The impact of environmental chemicals is well documented in animal models. If a substance affects Sertoli and Leydig cell differentiation (a common feature of TDS disorders) at an early developmental stage, germ cell growth and testosterone production will be impaired. These processes are essential for testes descent and genitalia development, meaning that genital abnormalities like cryptorchidism or hypospadias may be present from birth, and fertility problems and TGCC become apparent during adult life. Severity or number of disorders may therefore be dependent on the timing of the environmental exposure.Environmental factors can act directly, or via epigenetic mechanisms, and it is likely that a genetic susceptibility augmented by environmental factors is the primary cause of TDS.

=== Lifestyle ===
Links between maternal smoking and TDS are tenuous, but there are stronger associations between maternal alcohol consumption and incidences of cryptorchidism in sons. Smoking does however affect the growth of a fetus, and low birth weight is shown to increase the likelihood of all the disorders encompassed by TDS. Maternal obesity, resulting in gestational diabetes, has also been shown to be a risk factor for impaired testes development and TDS symptoms in sons.

== Pathogenesis ==
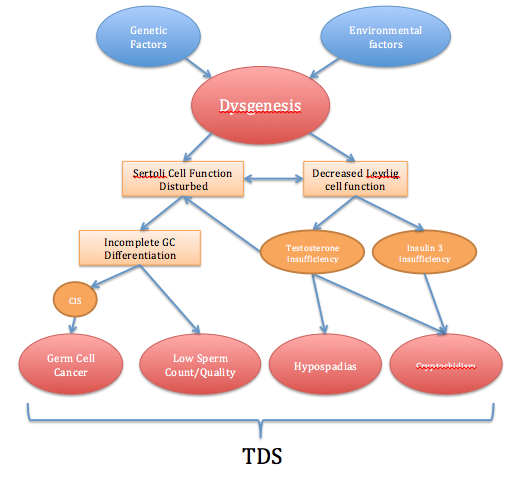
Schematic diagram illustrating the pathogenic links that lead to TDS. CIS = carcinoma in situ; GC = Germ Cell

The TDS hypothesis proposes that testicular dysgenesis, which has various primary causes, can lead to abnormalities in Sertoli and/or Leydig cell function. This leads to both impaired germ cell development and hormonal changes during male sexual differentiation. For instance, insufficient production of testosterone can result in incomplete masculinisation, whilst reduced expression of insulin-like factor 3 can lead to incomplete testes descent. The downstream disorders of such abnormalities can include both genital malformations (e.g. hypospadias and cryptorchidism) and delayed reproductive disorders (e.g. testicular cancer and poor semen quality) which comprise TDS.

== Diagnosis ==
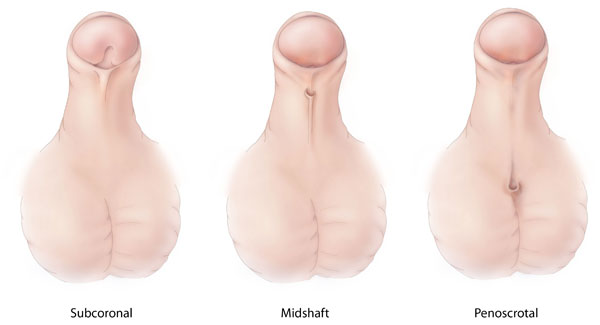
Hypospadias

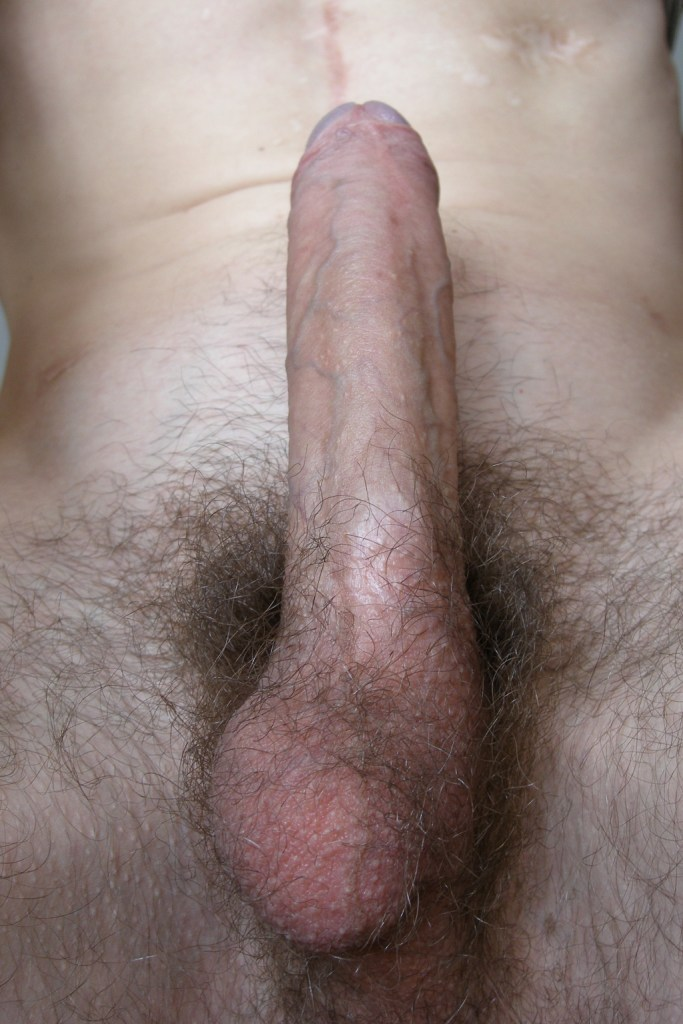
Cryptorchidism - Left testicle is missing.

=== Hypospadias ===
Hypospadias presents as an abnormal location for the end of the urethra which is typically found on the distal end of the penis. It is generally diagnosed at birth from visual confirmation of the hallmark features. As well as an unusual location of the urethra, the prepuce (foreskin) is typically incomplete as well. The abnormal 'hooded' prepuce is what often draws attention to the condition but can occur separately to hypospadias.

=== Cryptorchidism ===
In cryptorchidism a diagnosis is made from a physical examination which is performed when the baby is lacking one or both testes in the dependant portion of the scrotal sac. 70% of cryptorchid testes can be felt and are unable to be pulled into the scrotum or retreat quickly after being pulled into a higher position. In 30% of cases the testes cannot be felt indicating an intra-abdominal location. The risk factors for cryptorchidism are a family history of the condition, low birth weight, and premature birth.

=== Poor semen quality ===
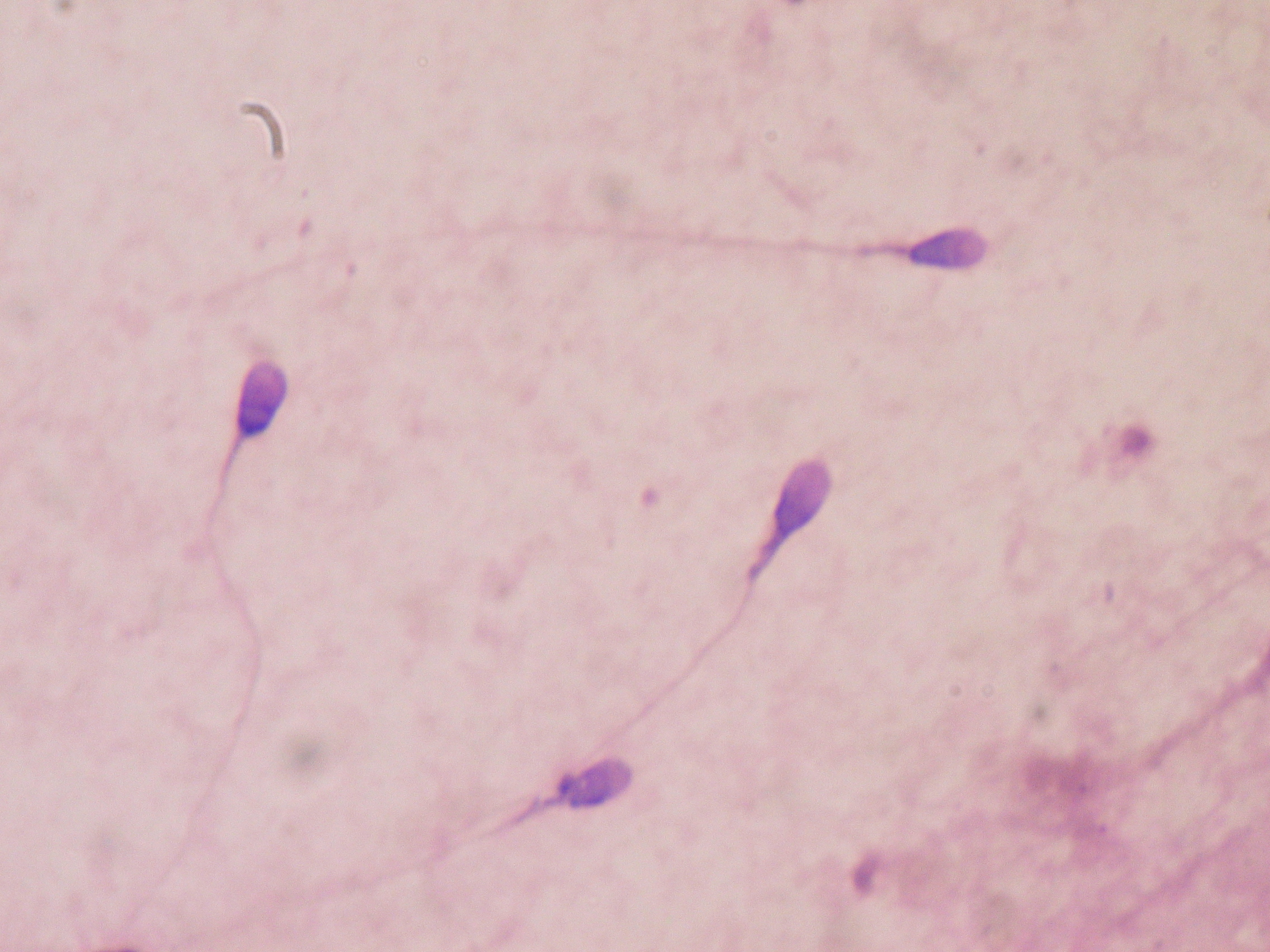
Human sperm stained for semen analysis

Poor semen quality is measured not only by the number of sperm a man produces but also by how effective the sperm is at fertilising an egg. The motility and shape of the sperm are important for this role. A man with poor semen quality will often present with fertility problems which are defined as a couple trying to conceive for over 1 year with no success. Diagnosis can be made from semen analysis, taking a sample of the man's semen and running tests to count numbers and quality of the individual sperm.

=== Testicular cancer ===
The most common presentation of testicular cancer is a hard, painless lump which can be felt on one of the testis. It is either noticed by a clinician during a routine examination, or the patient themselves. Risk factors for TC include cryptorchidism, family history, and previous testicular cancer. A diagnosis is confirmed in various ways. An ultrasound scan can be used to diagnose to a 90-95% accuracy. Blood can also be taken to look for elevated tumour markers which are also used to analyse the patient's response to treatment.
