= Semen quality =

Measure of male fertility

Semen quality is a measure of male fertility, a measure of the ability of sperm in semen to accomplish fertilization. Semen quality involves both sperm quantity and quality. Semen quality is a major factor in fertility.

Cryptorchidism, hypospadias, testicular cancer and poor semen quality make up the syndrome known as testicular dysgenesis syndrome.

== Factors ==
Many factors influence sperm quality. Exposure to any of the temporary factors can cause up to a three-month delay before sperm quality returns to normal, due to spermiogenesis.

=== General decline ===
A 2017 review and meta-analysis found sperm counts among Western men (i.e. men in Australia, Europe, New Zealand, and North America) declined 50–60% between 1973 and 2011, with an average decline of 1.4% per year. The meta-analysis found no indication the decline is leveling off. The decline among North American and Australian/European men is similar. The decline in sperm count among men in South America, Asia, and Africa is less than men in Western countries, though the amount of decline in these regions is uncertain. The reasons for the decline are not known with certainty, but it may be associated with chemical exposure, maternal smoking during prenatal development, pesticide exposure, or lifestyle changes during adulthood.

=== Age ===
Although it is possible for men to father children into old age, the genetic quality of sperm, as well as its volume and motility, all typically decrease with age. Advancing paternal age has been implicated in several possible health effects. One particularly well-studied connection is the link between advancing age and autism. For example, one study of 943,664 children less than 10 years old found that, with confounding variables controlled, the risk of autism increased with increasing paternal age.

In men with a normal level of sperm production (normozoospermia), the percentage of sperm DNA fragmentation is positively correlated with age, and inversely correlated with progressive sperm motility. No age-related effects on sperm were noted in separate control groups recruited in different geographical locations, indicating that dietary habits, lifestyle, or ethnicity could play a part in the quality of sperm.

While advanced age can be a possible factor in sperm motility and health, the sperm of men below 20 years of age has likewise been linked to an increase in birth defects such as neural tube defects, hypospadias, cystic kidney, and Down syndrome.

=== Heat ===
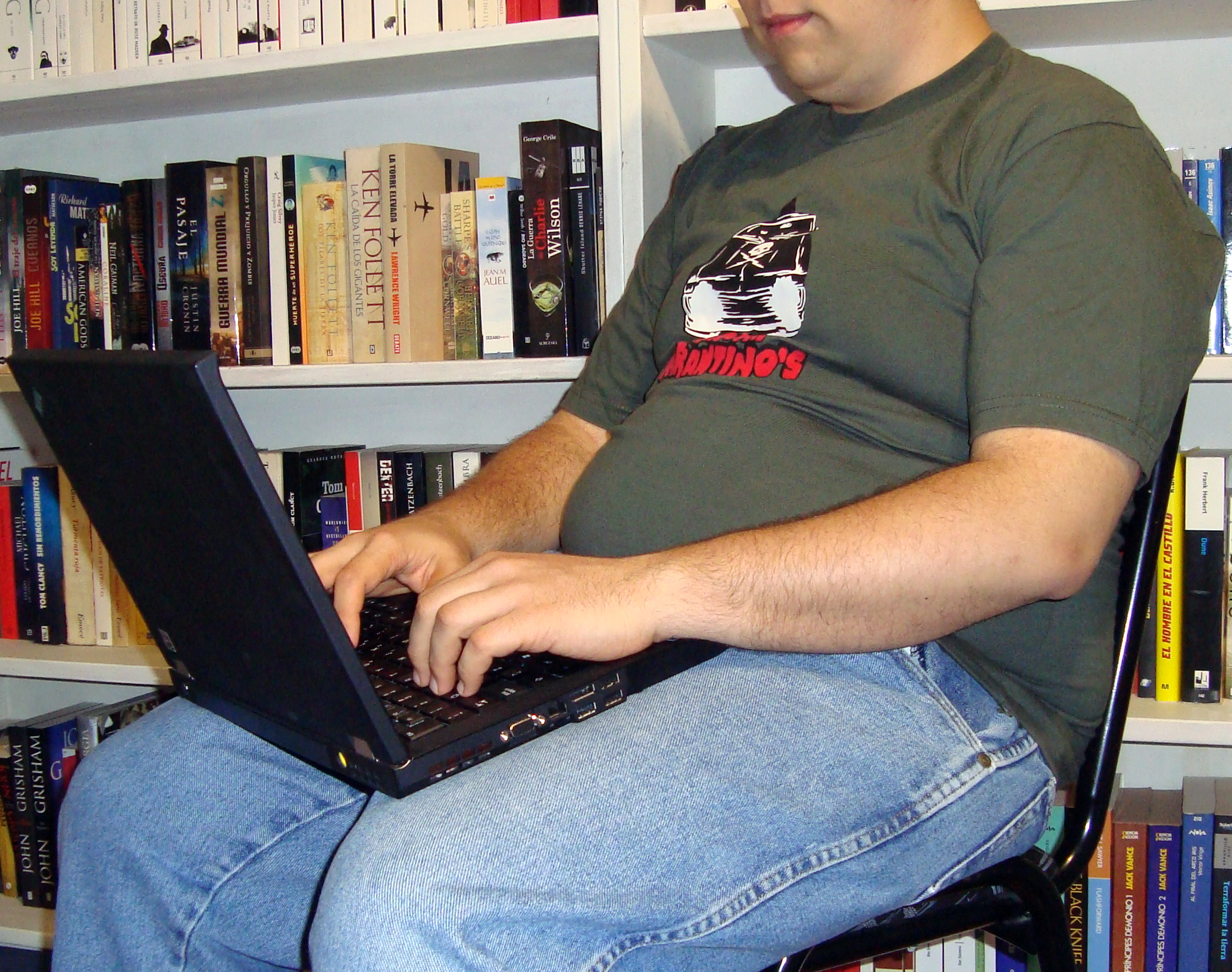
A man using a laptop that is placed above his groin. The heat of this may interfere with the quality of his semen.

Sperm are heat-sensitive, and cannot endure high temperatures. Increases of 2–3 °C are associated with increased DNA fragmentation. The body has compensatory mechanisms, like the cremaster muscle relaxing and letting the testicle hang further away from the warm body, sweating, and a countercurrent exchange of blood cooling inflowing blood. However, despite these compensations, some activities should not be performed too often, to prevent infertility due to heat:

- sauna sessions
- bathing for a long time in hot water
- Long-time tanning bed sessions
- Placement of a laptop computer over the groin for extended use

Fever raises the body temperature, which can affect sperm quality.

Contrary to widely held beliefs, no evidence supports that wearing tight underpants decreases fertility. Even with an elevation in temperature of 0.8–1° caused by wearing constrictive underwear, no changes in sperm parameters, no decrease in spermatogenesis, and no changes in sperm function are observed.

=== Physical trauma ===
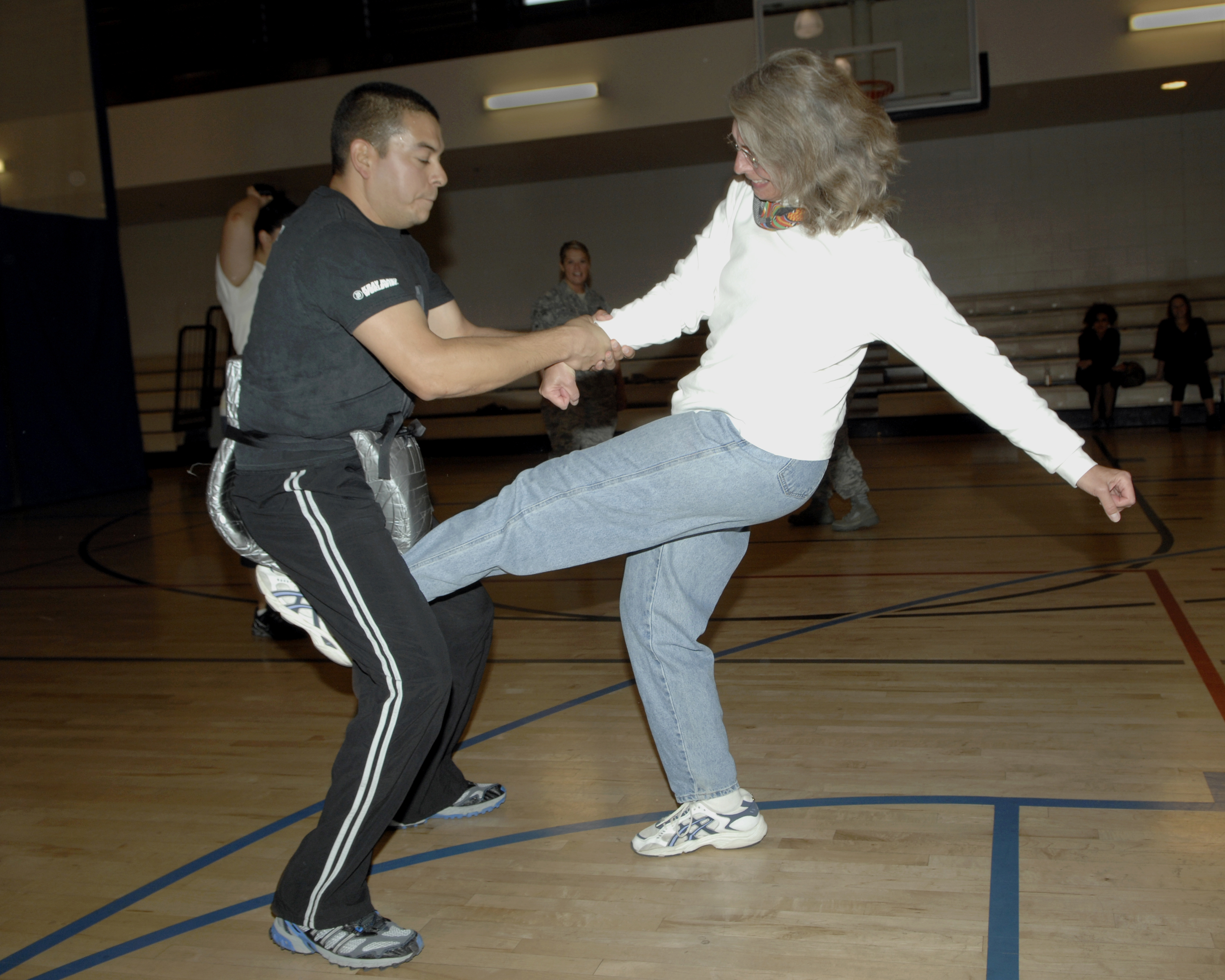
A man getting kicked in the scrotum, causing physical trauma to the testicles

A blow from the outside does not affect the sperm quality of already produced sperm cells. Furthermore, the testes are well protected in the scrotum, for example by the tunica vaginalis, making the testes slide away from external pressure rather than being malformed from it; however, a hard enough hit can close or crush the capillaries that supply the sperm-producing tissue, resulting in permanent or temporary and partial or total inability to produce sperm in the affected testicle.

=== Chemicals ===
There is suspicion that many toxic substances, including several types of medication and hormones, and also constituents of the diet, influence sperm quality. While a few chemicals with known effects on fertility have been excluded from human consumption, we cannot know if others remain undiscovered. Many products that come into direct contact with spermatozoa lack adequate testing for any adverse effect on semen quality.

==== Endocrine disruptors ====
Endocrine disruptors are chemicals that interfere with the endocrine (hormone) system.

A 2008 report demonstrated evidence of the effects of feminizing chemicals on male development in each class of vertebrate species as a worldwide phenomenon; these chemicals are suspected of reducing the sex ratio and sperm counts in humans. Ninety-nine percent of over 100,000 recently introduced chemicals are poorly regulated.

At least three types of synthetic toxins have been found in the semen of student volunteers: polychlorinated biphenyls (PCBs), DDT, and hexachlorobenzene. DDT and hexachlorobenzene are associated with decreased semen quality, while PCBs are associated with decreased fertility overall. Leaks of dibromochloropropane (DBCP) have caused sterility in men. Soldiers that were exposed to dioxins and dioxin-like compounds during the Vietnam war have given rise to children with an increased rate of birth defects.

Phthalates, a ubiquitous pollutant, may cause decreased sperm production when having been exposed to it during prenatal development.

Other potential xenoestrogens that have been associated with decreased sperm quality in some studies are bisphenol A, nonylphenol and octylphenol.

==== Medication ====
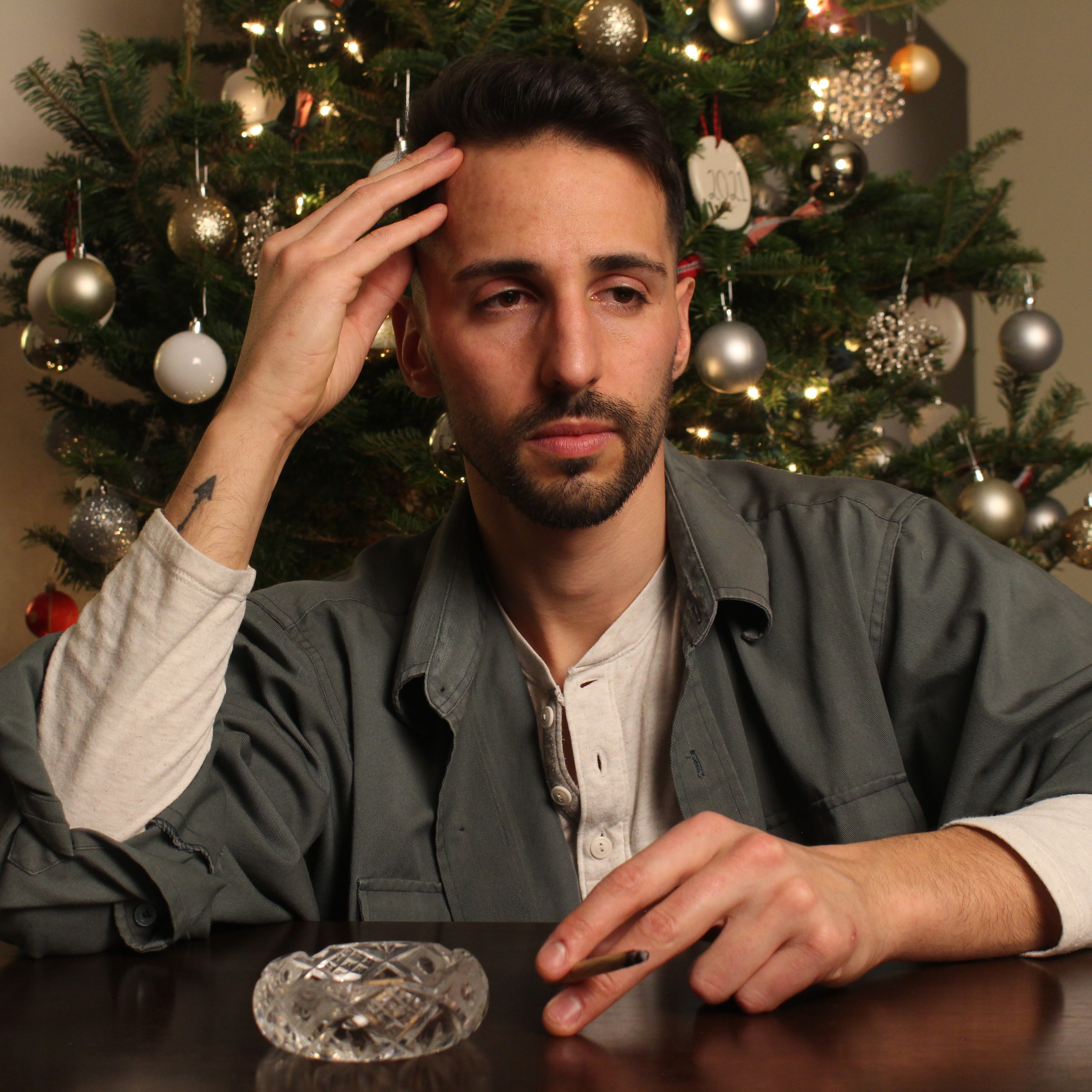
A man smoking a marijuana joint containing THC which can have a negative impact on semen quality.

- Depo-Provera, Adjudin, and gossypol are examples of substances used as male contraceptives or in chemical castration. Recent studies have found that THC present in cannabis can confuse the movements of intact sperm, reducing their ability to achieve fertilization.
- Many antibiotics, e.g., penicillin and tetracycline, suppress sperm production.

In addition, in vitro studies have observed altered sperm function by the following medications:

- Many psychoactive drugs, including many antidepressants, many antiepileptics (e.g., lithium), and propranolol
- Opioid analgesics
- Calcium channel blockers
- Phosphodiesterase inhibitors (e.g., caffeine, theophylline, pentoxifylline)
- Statins
- Calcium chelators (e.g., EDTA)

Also, numerous products intended for exposure to spermatozoa have only a general assumption of safety based on the absence of evidence of actual harm.

==== Hormones ====
- Anabolic steroids use and use of other hormones can reduce sperm quality. Changes in hormone homeostasis affect the spermatogenesis.

The body also has natural variations in hormone concentrations, giving sperm quality natural fluctuations as well.

==== Diet ====
- Drinking over 1 litre of cola a day might decrease sperm quality by up to 30% (study claims there is a correlation, but not causation)
- Soy products decrease sperm quality due to the high content of a type of phytoestrogen called isoflavones. Theoretically, this exposure to high levels of phytoestrogen in men may alter the hypothalamic-pituitary-gonadal axis. A few studies on animals have shown that such a hormonal effect may be significant and decrease fertility. On the other hand, most studies have shown that isoflavone supplements have little to no effect on sperm concentration, count, or mobility, and cause no changes in testicular or ejaculate volume.
- A review in 2010 concluded that there is little evidence for a relationship between semen parameters and increased BMI.
- Folate (vitamin B_{9}) may protect sperm cells from aneuploidy.
- Gossypol has been associated with reduced sperm production. It is present in crude cottonseed oil, and potentially the organ meats from animals poisoned with it
- A review of epidemiological/observational studies provided the most comprehensive analysis of the associations between diet or nutrient intake and the risk of infertility. It suggests that diet modifications may be useful in modulating male fertility and fecundability. Healthy diets (i.e. the Mediterranean diet) rich in such nutrients as omega-3 fatty acids, some antioxidants and vitamins, and low in saturated fatty acids (SFAs) and trans-fatty acids (TFAs) are associated with high semen quality parameters. In terms of food groups, fruit, seafood, poultry, eggs, cereals, leafy vegetables, dark chocolate, and low-fat dairy products have been positively related to sperm quality. However, diets rich in processed meat, fried foods, potatoes, full-fat dairy products, caffeine, alcohol, and sugar-sweetened beverages have been inversely associated with the quality of semen in some studies. The few studies relating male nutrient or food intake and fecundability also suggest that diets rich in red meat, processed meat, tea, and caffeine are associated with a lower rate of fecundability. This association is only controversial in the case of coffee, because a little bit of coffee, two to three cups a day, has been shown to help improve sperm motility, but more than three cups a day have been shown to have impaired fertility. The potential biological mechanisms linking diet with sperm function and fertility are largely unknown and require further study.
- One study found that following a diet rich in fruits, vegetables, potatoes, meat, full-fat dairy products, seafood, and pastries increased sperm count by 50%. Men who consume such a diet have sperm counts nearly twice as high as men who do not.

==== Other chemicals ====
Environmental mutagens that are associated with decreased semen quality include the following:

- Plutonium, widely spread from nuclear weapon tests, accumulates in the testes, where it disrupts zinc metabolism, in turn causing genetic damage.
- Ethylene oxide, a chemical sterilizer, is associated with decreased semen quality.

Other environmental agents associated with decreased semen quality include:

- Cadmium, causing damage to Sertoli cells, thereby impeding spermatogenesis.
- Lead, causing reduced spermatogenesis and abnormal spermatozoa.
- Mercury, being highly damaging to spermatogenesis.
- Many pesticides, causing decreased semen quality as well as sperm chromosome anomalies.
- Polybrominated diphenyl ethers (PBDEs).
- Many solvents, such as benzene, toluene, xylene, styrene, 1-bromopropane, 2-bromopropane, perchloroethylene, trichloroethylene.

=== Last ejaculation ===
How long the man has abstained before providing a semen sample correlates with the results of semen analysis and also with success rates in assisted reproductive technology (ART).

Periods that are too short or too long since the last ejaculation reduce semen quality.

A period of less than one day reduces sperm count by at least 20%.

Longer periods of abstinence correlate with poorer results—one study found that couples where the man had abstained for more than 10 days before an intrauterine insemination (IUI) had only a 3% pregnancy rate. An abstinence period of only 1 or 2 days produces the highest pregnancy rates per IUI cycle compared with longer intervals of ejaculatory abstinence. This increase in pregnancy rate occurs despite a lower value of total motile spermatozoa. Daily sexual activity increases sperm quality in men minimizing DNA damage in the sperm—because it is speculated to result in less storage time where damage may accumulate.

=== Masturbation vs intercourse ===
Semen samples obtained via sexual intercourse contain 70–120% more sperm, with sperm having a slightly higher motility and slightly more normal morphology, compared with semen samples obtained via masturbation. Sexual intercourse also generates a 25–45% increase in ejaculate volume, mainly by increased prostate secretion.

This intercourse advantage is even greater for men with oligospermia.

However, the single factor or factors for the intercourse advantage have not yet been isolated. It cannot be explained by presence of visual perception of physical attractiveness alone during stimulation, although there may be a slight correlation. Neither do any substantial fluctuations in sex hormones explain the intercourse advantage. It is hypothesized that sexual intercourse subdues an inhibition from the central nervous system, but what, in turn, is the subduing factor is still not completely known.

=== Home or in clinic ===
Sperm quality is higher when a sample is collected at home than in a clinic. Collecting the sperm at home gives a higher sperm concentration, sperm count, and motility, particularly if the sperm is collected via sexual intercourse. If the semen sample is to be collected by masturbation, a specimen from the early stages of the ejaculation should be placed into a clean, unused, sealed collection cup.

=== Environment ===
For semen that has been ejaculated, the quality deteriorates with time. However, this lifetime can be shortened or prolonged, depending on the environment.

==== Outside body ====
Sperm outside the body generally has a life expectancy that is considered to depend on pH, temperature, presence of air and other factors, and is unpredictable but smaller than the life expectancy inside the human body. For instance, sperm donors who collect the sample outside the clinic are advised to have handed in the sample no more than one hour from collection, and to keep it, if not at body temperature, then at least at room temperature.

In a non-harmful environment outside the body, such as in a sterile glass container the number of motile sperm decreases by approximately 5–10% per hour. In contrast, in a latex condom, the quality decreases by 60–80% per hour, rendering the sample unusable in a relatively short time.

==== In female ====
The environment in the uterus and fallopian tubes is advantageous. A pregnancy resulting from a sperm life of eight days has been documented.

=== Others ===
Tobacco smoking lowers sperm quality, perhaps by decreased ability to attach to hyaluronan on the egg cell. Wright et al. have reviewed evidence that smoking is associated with increased sperm DNA damage and male infertility. Smoking cannabis can decrease sperm quantity.

Long-term stress is also suggested. The practice of tucking can reduce both the sperm count and sperm quality. Meta-analysis indicates that mobile phone exposure affects sperm quality negatively.

Regarding diet, malnutrition or an unhealthy diet can lead to e.g. Zinc deficiency, lowering sperm quality.

Sperm quality is better in the afternoon than in the morning. Adrenaline-levels are higher during awakening (~06.00 to noon), which may contribute similarly to general stress.

Lack of exercise, as well as excessive exercise, are minor factors. In professional sports, semen quality parameters tend to decrease as training requirements increase. The effect differs substantially between different professional sport types. For example, water polo appears substantially less harmful to semen quality than triathlon.

A longer duration of sexual stimulation before ejaculation slightly increases sperm quality.

Males carrying Robertsonian translocations in their chromosomes have significantly higher degree of sperm cell apoptosis and lower concentration. Sperm cells also have decreased forward motility, but normal morphology.

Testicular cancer, Leydig cell tumours and Sertoli cell tumours are also associated with reduced sperm count and quality.

== Tests ==
=== Semen analysis ===
A semen analysis typically measures the number of sperm per millilitre of ejaculate and analyzes the morphology (shape) and motility (ability to swim forward) of the sperm (the typical ejaculate of a healthy, physically mature young adult male of reproductive age with no fertility-related problems usually contains 300–500 million spermatozoa, though only a couple of hundred survive in the acidic environment of the vagina to be candidates for successful fertilization). Also usually measured are the concentration of white blood cells, the level of fructose in the semen, and the volume, pH, and liquefaction time of the ejaculate.

=== Hamster zona-free ovum test ===
A man's sperm is mixed with hamster eggs that have had the zona pellucida (outer membranes) removed, and the number of sperm penetrations per egg is measured. No strong correlation has been found between hamster egg penetration rates and the various semen parameters and the role of the hamster egg penetration test in the investigation of the causes of infertility should be evaluated further. However, a negative result on the hamster test correlates with a lower probability of the man's partner becoming pregnant.

=== Antisperm antibodies test ===
Antisperm antibodies may be responsible for sperm agglutination, reduced sperm motility, and abnormal postcoital test. Several tests are presently available including sperm immobilization test, sperm agglutination tests, indirect immunofluorescence test, enzyme-linked immunosorbent assay, radiolabelled antiglobulin assay. One of the most informative and specific tests is the immunobead rosette test which can identify different antibody classes involved (IgG, IgA, IgM) and location on the sperm cell (head, body, or tail).

=== Hemizona test ===
The Hemizona test is a test to evaluate sperm zona-binding capacity. In this test, the two halves of human zona pellucida are incubated with the patient's capacitated sperm and control the fertile donor's sperm.

=== Other tests ===
- PCR-based detection of the pathogens in the semen of patients with asymptomatic genital infection.
- Biochemical markers like creatine kinase, Reactive oxygen species.

== Cryopreservation ==
When performing cryopreservation of semen, it is the sperm quality after reviving the sample that is of importance, because many sperm cells die in the process.

To be of use in assisted reproductive technology, the sample should after thawing have more than 5 million motile sperm cells per ml with a good grade of mobility. If the grade of mobility is poor, 10 million motile cells per ml is required.

Home insemination of previously frozen sperm can be accomplished with the use of a cervical cap conception device as a delivery system for the sperm.

=== Bad freezers ===
In 10–20% of all men, the semen does not endure cryopreservation.

=== Sperm washing ===
When a sperm sample is prepared for intrauterine insemination, it is washed at a facility such as a fertility clinic or a sperm bank. Some sperm does not survive the washing process, as is also the case when freezing the sperm.

== See also ==
- Male infertility crisis
- Ovum quality
- Semen analysis
