= Oligospermia =

Abnormally low sperm count

- Other names: oligozoospermia, low sperm count
- Specialty: Urology

Terms oligospermia, oligozoospermia, and low sperm count refer to semen with a low concentration of sperm and is a common finding in male infertility. Often, semen with a decreased sperm concentration may also show significant abnormalities in sperm morphology and motility (technically oligoasthenoteratozoospermia). There has been interest in replacing the descriptive terms used in semen analysis with more quantitative information.

== Diagnosis ==
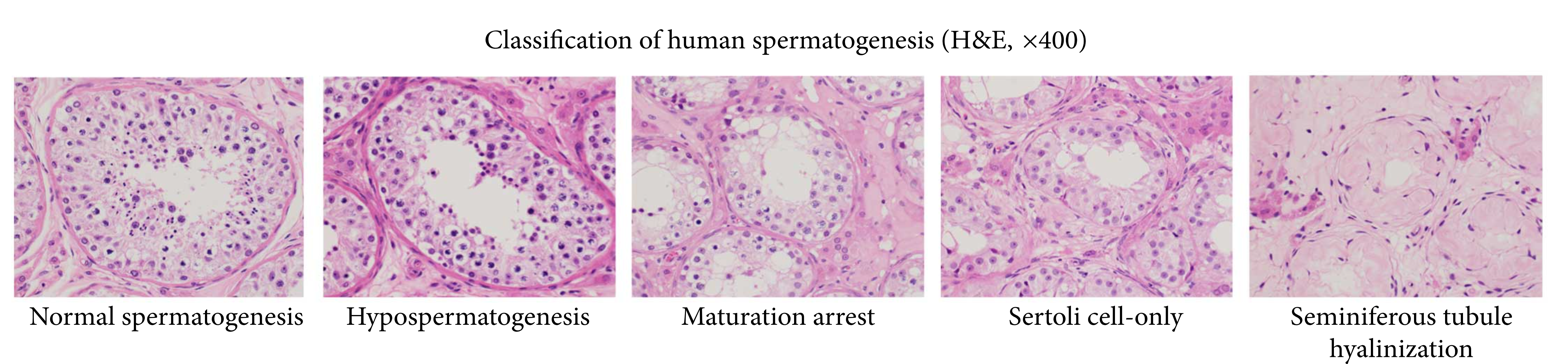
Histopathology of various spermatogenesis disorders.

The diagnosis of oligozoospermia is based on one low count in a semen analysis performed on two occasions. For many decades sperm concentrations of less than 20 million sperm/ml were considered low or oligospermic, recently, however, the WHO reassessed sperm criteria and established a lower reference point, less than 15 million sperm/ml, consistent with the 5th percentile for fertile men. Sperm concentrations fluctuate daily, and oligozoospermia may be temporary or permanent.

The diagnosis of oligozoospermia requires a work-up via semen analysis (listed in Male infertility).

== Causes ==
There are many causes for oligospermia, including:

=== Pre-testicular causes ===
Pre-testicular factors refer to conditions that impede adequate support of the testes and include situations of poor hormonal support and poor general health, including:

- Hypogonadism due to various causes
- Drugs, alcohol, smoking
- Strenuous riding (bicycle riding, horseback riding)
- Medications, including androgens.

=== Testicular factors ===
Testicular factors refer to conditions where the testes produce semen of poor quality despite adequate hormonal support and include:

- Age
- Genetic defects on the Y chromosome
  - Y chromosome microdeletions
- Abnormal set of chromosomes
  - Klinefelter syndrome
- Neoplasm, e.g. seminoma
- Cryptorchidism
- Varicocele (14% in one study)
- Trauma
- Hydrocele
- Mumps
- Malaria
- Defects in USP26 enzyme in some cases

Mast cells releasing inflammatory mediators appear to directly suppress sperm motility in a potentially reversible manner, and may be a common pathophysiological mechanism for several of the factors mentioned above.

=== Post-testicular causes ===
Post-testicular factors decrease male fertility due to conditions that affect the male genital system after testicular sperm production and include defects of the genital tract as well as problems in ejaculation:

- Vas deferens obstruction
- Lack of Vas deferens, often related to genetic markers for cystic fibrosis
- Infection, e.g. prostatitis
- Ejaculatory duct obstruction

=== Idiopathic oligospermia (oligoasthenoteratozoospermia) ===
In about 30% of infertile men, no causative factor is found for their decrease in sperm concentration or quality by common clinical, instrumental, or laboratory means, and the condition is termed "idiopathic" (unexplained). Several factors may be involved in the genesis of this condition, including age, infectious agents ( such as Chlamydia trachomatis), Y chromosome microdeletions, mitochondrial changes, environmental pollutants, and "subtle" hormonal changes.

A review in 2013 came to the result that oligospermia and azoospermia are significantly associated with being overweight (odds ratio 1.1), obese (odds ratio 1.3) and morbidly obese (odds ratio 2.0), but the cause of this is unknown. It found no significant relation between oligospermia and being underweight.

=== DNA damage ===
The human breast cancer susceptibility gene 2 (BRCA2) is employed in homologous recombinational repair of DNA damages during meiosis. A common single-nucleotide polymorphism of BRCA2 is associated with severe oligospermia.

Men with mild oligospermia (semen concentration of 15 million to 20 million sperm/ml) were studied for an association of sperm DNA damage with lifestyle factors. A significant association was found between sperm DNA damage and factors such as age, obesity, and occupational stress.

== Treatment ==
Treatment takes place within the context of infertility management and also needs to consider the fecundity of the female partner. Thus, the choices can be complex.

In a number of situations direct medical or surgical intervention can improve the sperm concentration, examples are use of FSH in men with pituitary hypogonadism, antibiotics in case of infections, or operative corrections of a hydrocele, varicocele, or vas deferens obstruction.

In most cases of oligospermia, including its idiopathic form, there is no direct medical or surgical intervention agreed to be effective. Empirically many medical approaches have been tried including clomiphene citrate, tamoxifen, HMG, FSH, HCG, testosterone, Vitamin E, Vitamin C, anti-oxidants, carnitine, acetyl-L-carnitine, zinc, high-protein diets. In several pilot studies, some positive results have been obtained. Clomiphene citrate has been used with modest success. The combination of tamoxifen plus testosterone was reported to improve the sperm situation.

The use of carnitine showed some promise in a controlled trial in selected cases of male infertility, improving sperm quality, and further studies are needed.

In many situations, intrauterine inseminations are performed successfully. In more severe cases IVF, or IVF - ICSI is done and is often the best option, specifically if time is a factor or fertility problems coexist on the female side. The Low dose Estrogen Testosterone Combination Therapy may improve sperm count and motility in some men including severe oligospermia.

== Fertility ==
Achieving a pregnancy naturally may be a challenge if the male has a low sperm count. However, chances are good if the female partner is fertile; many couples with this problem have been successful. Prognosis is more limited if there is a combination of factors that include sperm dysfunction and reduced ovarian reserve.

== See also ==
- Conception device
- Male infertility
- Semen quality
- Vasectomy
