= Sperm motility =

Process involved in the controlled movement of a sperm cell

Video of human sperm cells moving under a microscope

Sperm motility describes the ability of sperm to move properly through the female reproductive tract (internal fertilization) or through water (external fertilization) to reach the egg. Sperm motility can also be thought of as the quality, which is a factor in successful conception; sperm that do not "swim" properly will not reach the egg in order to fertilize it. Sperm motility in mammals also facilitates the passage of the sperm through the cumulus oophorus (a layer of cells) and the zona pellucida (a layer of extracellular matrix), which surround the mammalian oocyte.

In the wood mouse Apodemus sylvaticus, sperms aggregate in 'trains' that are better able to fertilize eggs because they are more capable of navigating the viscous environment of the female reproductive tract. The trains move in a sinusoidal motion.

Sperm motility is also affected by certain factors released by eggs.

Sperm movement is activated by changes in intracellular ion concentration. The changes in ion concentration that provoke motility are different among species. In marine invertebrates and sea urchins, the rise in pH to about 7.2–7.6 activates ATPase which leads to a decrease in intracellular potassium, and thus induces membrane hyperpolarization. As a result, sperm movement is activated. The change in cell volume which alters intracellular ion concentration can also contribute to the activation of sperm motility. In some mammals, sperm motility is activated by increase in pH, calcium ion and cAMP, yet it is suppressed by low pH in the epididymis.

The tail of the sperm - the flagellum - confers motility upon the sperm, and has three principal components:

1. a central skeleton constructed of 11 microtubules collectively termed the axoneme and similar to the equivalent structure found in cilia
2. a thin cell membrane covering the axoneme
3. mitochondria arranged spirally around the axoneme at the middle-piece,

Back and forth movement of the tail results from a rhythmical longitudinal sliding motion between the anterior and posterior tubules that make up the axoneme. The energy for this process is supplied by ATP produced by mitochondria. The velocity of a sperm in fluid medium is usually 1–4 mm/min. This allows the sperm to move towards an ovum in order to fertilize it.

The axoneme is attached at its base to a centriole known as the distal centriole and acts as a basal body. In most animals, this distal centriole act as a shock absorber preventing the microtubules filaments from moving at the axoneme base. In contrast, in mammals, the distal centriole evolved an atypical structure, known as the atypical distal centriole. The atypical centriole is made of splayed microtubules organized into left and right sides. During sperm movement, the two sides move relative to each other, helping to shape the waveform of the sperm tail.

In mammals, spermatozoa mature functionally through a process which is known as capacitation. When spermatozoa reach the isthmic oviduct, their motility has been reported to be reduced as they attach to epithelium. Near the time of ovulation, hyperactivation occurs. During this process, the flagella move with high curvature and long wavelength. Hyperactivation is initiated by extracellular calcium; however, the factors that regulate calcium level is unknown.

Without technological intervention, a non-motile or abnormally-motile sperm is not going to fertilize. Therefore, the fraction of a sperm population that is motile is widely used as a measure of semen quality. Insufficient sperm motility is a common cause of subfertility or infertility. Several measures are available to improve sperm quality.

== Axoneme movement ==
Sperm motility is dependent on several metabolic pathways and regulatory mechanisms.

The axonemal bend movement is based on the active sliding of axonemal doublet microtubules by the molecular motor dynein, which is divided into an outer and an inner arm. Outer and inner arm plays different roles in the production and regulation of flagellar motility: the outer arm increase the beat frequency, the inner arm is involved in the propulsion and propagation of flagellar bending. The bending of the flagellum is due to subsequent cycles of dynein arm attachment, generation of force and detachment on the B subunit. The binding of the axoneme is the result of the presence of a resistance to the microtubule sliding generated by dynein.

Dyneins on the two sides of the central pair apparatus are regulated in an opposite way by an activation/disactivation game made by the radialspoke-central pair apparatus, that regulates the flagellar bending. Sperm motility is regulated by several pathways and the most important are the Calcium pathway and the PKA pathway. This pathwaysinvolve ions, adenylyl cyclase, cAMP, membrane channels and phosphorylations.

The first event is the activation of a Na^{+}/HCO3 ^{−} (NBC) co-transporter and the regulation of HCO3 ^{−} /Cl^{−} by SLC26 transporters, that bring to an increase in HCO3 ^{−} levels.

The second event is the activation of an Na^{+}/H^{+} exchanger and of the proton channel Hv-1, that leads to an increase in pH levels.

These increase in HCO3 ^{−} and pH levels bring to the activation of the CatSper channel, a sperm membrane specific calcium channel. CatSperm can be activated also by progesterone and albumine. CatSper, once activated, opens and let free calcium entrance inside the cell, with a global increase in calcium intracellular levels.

Together, the increase in HCO3 ^{−}, pH and calcium leads to the activation of a soluble adenylyl cyclase (SAC or SACY), that increases the production of cAMP and brings to the activation of PKA, a protein kinase that phosphorylates several tyrosine kinases and leads to a phosphorylation cascade that ends with the phosphorylation of the axonemal dynein and the start of flagellar movement.

== Sperm DNA damage ==
Sperm DNA damage is common in infertile men. About 31% of men with sperm motility defects have high levels of sperm DNA fragmentation.

== Sperm motility and age ==
Sperm motility increases from puberty through one's mid-thirties. Research shows that from the age of 36 onwards, sperm motility decreases from 40% Grade A & B to 31% in one's 50s. The effects of aging on semen quality is summarized below based on a study of 1,219 subjects:

| Age group (years) | Number of subjects (n) | Motility (% Grade A+B) [Min-Max] |
|---|---|---|
| 21-28 | 57 | 47.5 ± 25.4 [0-88] |
| 29-35 | 450 | 48.1 ± 30.4 [0-95] |
| 36-42 | 532 | 40.0 ± 27.1 [0-83] |
| 43-49 | 165 | 33.1 ± 25.1 [0-84] |
| 50-60 | 15 | 31.3 ± 23.9 [0-59] |

== Classifications of motility ==
1. Rapid progressive motility(≥ 25 μm/s)
2. Slow progressive motility(5-25 μm/s)
3. Non-progressive motility(<5 μm/s)
4. Non-motile
