= USP26 =

Protein found in humans

Identifiers
- Aliases: USP26, ubiquitin specific peptidase 26
- External IDs: OMIM: 300309; MGI: 1933247; GeneCards: USP26
Enzyme activity
| EC # | BRENDA | ExPASy | KEGG | MetaCyc |
|---|---|---|---|---|
| 3.4.19.12 | ↗ | ↗ | ↗ | ↗ |

Gene location (Human)
| Chr. | X chromosome (human) |
| Band | Xq26.2 | Start | 133,023,168 bp |
| Band | Xq26.2 | End | 133,097,109 bp |

Gene location (Mouse)
| Chr. | X chromosome (mouse) |
| Band | X|X A5 | Start | 50,842,836 bp |
| Band | X|X A5 | End | 50,890,110 bp |
RNA expression pattern
| Bgee | Human / Mouse (ortholog); Top expressed in: testicle; gonad; muscle of thigh; stromal cell of endometrium; muscle tissue; skeletal muscle tissue; occipital lobe; right uterine tube; primary visual cortex; cecum / Top expressed in: spermatid; zygote; embryo; embryo; secondary oocyte; spermatocyte; epiblast; primary oocyte; testicle; More reference expression data |
| BioGPS | n/a |
Gene ontology
| Molecular function | peptidase activity; cysteine-type peptidase activity; protein binding; hydrolase activity; thiol-dependent deubiquitinase; cysteine-type endopeptidase activity |
| Cellular component | nucleus; nucleoplasm |
| Biological process | ubiquitin-dependent protein catabolic process; proteolysis; protein deubiquitination; G1/S transition of mitotic cell cycle |
Sources:Amigo / QuickGO
Orthologs
| Databases | NCBI: entry; OMA: entry |
| Species | Human | Mouse |
| Entrez | 83844 | 83563 |
| Ensembl | ENSG00000134588 | ENSMUSG00000055780 |
| UniProt | Q9BXU7 | Q99MX1 |
| RefSeq (mRNA) | NM_031907 | NM_031388 |
| RefSeq (protein) | NP_114113 | NP_113565 |
| Location (UCSC) | Chr X: 133.02 – 133.1 Mb | Chr X: 50.84 – 50.89 Mb |
| PubMed search |
- Wikidata
| View/Edit Human | View/Edit Mouse |

Ubiquitin carboxyl-terminal hydrolase 26 is an enzyme that in humans is encoded by the USP26 gene. It functions as a peptidase that specifically targets ubiquitin.

The USP26 gene is an X-linked gene exclusively expressed in the testis and it codes for the ubiquitin-specific protease 26. The USP26 gene is found at Xq26.2 on the X-chromosome as a single exon. The enzyme that this gene encodes comprises 913 amino acid residues and it is 104 kilodalton in size, which is transcribed from a sequence of 2794 nucleotide base-pairs on the X-chromosome. The USP26 enzyme is a deubiquitinating enzyme that places a very significant role in the regulation of protein turnover during spermatogenesis. It is a testis-specific enzyme that is solely express in spermatogonia and can prevent the degradation of ubiquitinated USP26 substrates.

Recent research has suggested that defects in USP26 may be involved in some cases of male infertility, specifically Sertoli cell-only syndrome, and an absence of sperm in the ejaculate (azoospermia).

== See also ==
- Male infertility
