= Institute for Public Health Sciences =

The Institute for Public Health Sciences at Yeshiva University provides research and training opportunities for faculty, students, and researchers interested in public health and preventive medicine, consolidating university resources in these areas and creating new programs, including a Master of Public Health degree. The institute emphasizes public health research with a particular focus on the behavioral determinants of health, global health issues, and health disparities.

In addition to Albert Einstein College of Medicine and Ferkauf Graduate School of Psychology, Yeshiva University programs involved include Benjamin N. Cardozo School of Law, Wurzweiler School of Social Work, and Sy Syms School of Business.

The institute was formerly co-directed by Sonia Suchday.
