= Male infertility =

- Specialty: Urology, andrology

Male infertility refers to a sexually mature male's inability to impregnate a fertile female. Male infertility can wholly or partially account for 40% of infertility among couples who are trying to have children. It affects approximately 7% of all men. Male infertility is commonly due to deficiencies in the semen. Semen quality is used as a surrogate measure of male fecundity. More recently, advanced sperm analyses that examine intracellular sperm components are being developed.

== Age considerations ==
Sperm motility increases from puberty through one's mid-thirties. Research shows that, from the age of 36 onwards, sperm motility decreases from 40% Grade A & B to 31% in one's 50s. The effects of aging on semen quality is summarized below based on a study of 1,219 subjects:

| Age group (years) | Number of subjects (n) | Motility (% Grade A+B) [Min-Max] |
|---|---|---|
| 21–28 | 57 | 47.5 ± 25.4 [0-88] |
| 29–35 | 450 | 48.1 ± 30.4 [0-95] |
| 36–42 | 532 | 40.0 ± 27.1 [0-83] |
| 43–49 | 165 | 33.1 ± 25.1 [0-84] |
| 50–60 | 15 | 31.3 ± 23.9 [0-59] |

90% of seminiferous tubules in men in their 20s and 30s contain spermatids, whereas men in their 40s and 50s have spermatids in 50% of their seminiferous tubules, and only 10% of seminiferous tubules from men aged over 80 contain spermatids. In a random international sample of 11,548 men confirmed to be biological fathers by DNA paternity testing, the oldest father was found to be 66 years old at the birth of his child. The ratio of DNA-confirmed versus DNA-rejected paternity tests around that age is in agreement with the notion of general male infertility above age 65–66.

== Causes ==
Factors relating to male infertility include:

=== Immune infertility ===
Antisperm antibodies (ASA) have been considered as the cause of infertility in around 10–30% of infertile couples. ASA production are directed against surface antigens on sperm, which can interfere with sperm motility and transport through the female reproductive tract, inhibiting capacitation and acrosome reaction, impaired fertilization, influence on the implantation process, and impaired growth and development of the embryo. Risk factors for the formation of antisperm antibodies in men include the breakdown of the blood‑testis barrier, trauma and surgery, orchitis, varicocele, infections, prostatitis, testicular cancer, failure of immunosuppression and unprotected receptive anal or oral sex with men.

=== Genetics ===
Chromosomal anomalies and genetic mutations account for nearly 10–15% of all male infertility cases.

=== Mitochondrial DNA ===
Mature human sperm contains almost no mitochondrial DNA at all. An increased amount of mitochondrial DNA in the sperm cells has shown to have a negative impact on fertility.

=== Klinefelter syndrome ===
One of the most commonly known causes of infertility is Klinefelter syndrome, which affects one in 500–1000 newborn males. Klinefelter syndrome is a chromosomal defect that occurs during gamete formation due to a non-disjunction error during cell division. This results in males having smaller testes, reducing the amount of testosterone and sperm production. Males with this syndrome carry an extra X chromosome (XXY), meaning they have 47 chromosomes compared to the normal 46 in each cell. This extra chromosome directly affects sexual development before birth and during puberty. A variation of Klinefelter syndrome is when some cells in an individual have the extra X chromosome but others do not, referred to as mosaic Klinefelter syndrome. The reduction of testosterone in the male body normally results in an overall decrease in the production of viable sperm for these individuals, thereby making it hard for them to father children without fertility treatment.

=== Y chromosome deletions ===
Y chromosomal infertility is a direct cause of male infertility due to its effects on sperm production, occurring in approximately one in 2000 males. Usually, affected men show no symptoms, although they may have smaller testes. Men with this condition may exhibit azoospermia (no sperm production), oligozoospermia (small number of sperm production), or they may produce abnormally shaped sperm (teratozoospermia). This case of infertility occurs during the development of gametes in the male. Where a normal healthy male will have both an X and a Y chromosome, affected males have genetic deletions in the Y chromosome. These deletions affect protein production that is vital for spermatogenesis. Studies have shown that this is an inherited trait; if a male is fathered by a man who also exhibited Y chromosome deletions then this trait will be passed down. These individuals are thereby "Y-linked". Daughters are not affected and cannot be carriers due to their lack of a Y chromosome.

==== Other ====
- Age group 12–49 (Paternal age effect)
- Aneuploidy, an abnormal number of chromosomes
- Centriole
- Neoplasm, e.g. seminoma
- Idiopathic failure
- Cryptorchidism
- Trauma
- Hydrocele, particularly hydrocele testis
- Hypopituitarism in adults, and hypopituitarism untreated in children (resulting in growth hormone deficiency and proportionate dwarfism.)
- Mumps
- Malaria
- Testicular cancer
- Defects in USP26 in some cases
- Acrosomal defects affecting egg penetration
- Idiopathic oligospermia – unexplained sperm deficiencies account for 30% of male infertility.

=== Pre-testicular causes ===
Pre-testicular factors refer to conditions that impede adequate support of the testes and include situations of poor hormonal support and poor general health including:

- Varicocele, a condition of swollen testicle veins with an incidence of 15% in fertile men and about 40% in infertile men. It is present in up to 35% of cases of primary infertility and 69–81% of secondary infertility.
- Hypogonadotropic hypogonadism due to various causes
  - Obesity increases the risk of hypogonadotropic hypogonadism. Animal models indicate that obesity causes leptin insensitivity in the hypothalamus, leading to decreased Kiss1 expression, which, in turn, alters the release of gonadotropin-releasing hormone (GnRH).
- Undiagnosed and untreated coeliac disease (CD). Coeliac men may have reversible infertility. Nevertheless, CD can present with several non-gastrointestinal symptoms that can involve nearly any organ system, even in the absence of gastrointestinal symptoms. Thus, the diagnosis may be missed, leading to a risk of long-term complications. In men, CD can reduce semen quality and cause immature secondary sex characteristics, hypogonadism and hyperprolactinaemia, which causes impotence and loss of libido. The giving of gluten free diet and correction of deficient dietary elements can lead to a return of fertility. It is likely that an effective evaluation for infertility would best include assessment for underlying celiac disease, both in men and women.
- Drugs, alcohol
- Strenuous riding (bicycle riding, horseback riding)
- Medications, including those that affect spermatogenesis such as chemotherapy, fluoxetine, anabolic steroids, cimetidine, spironolactone; those that decrease FSH levels such as phenytoin; those that decrease sperm motility such as sulfasalazine and nitrofurantoin
- Genetic abnormalities such as a Robertsonian translocation

==== Tobacco smoking ====
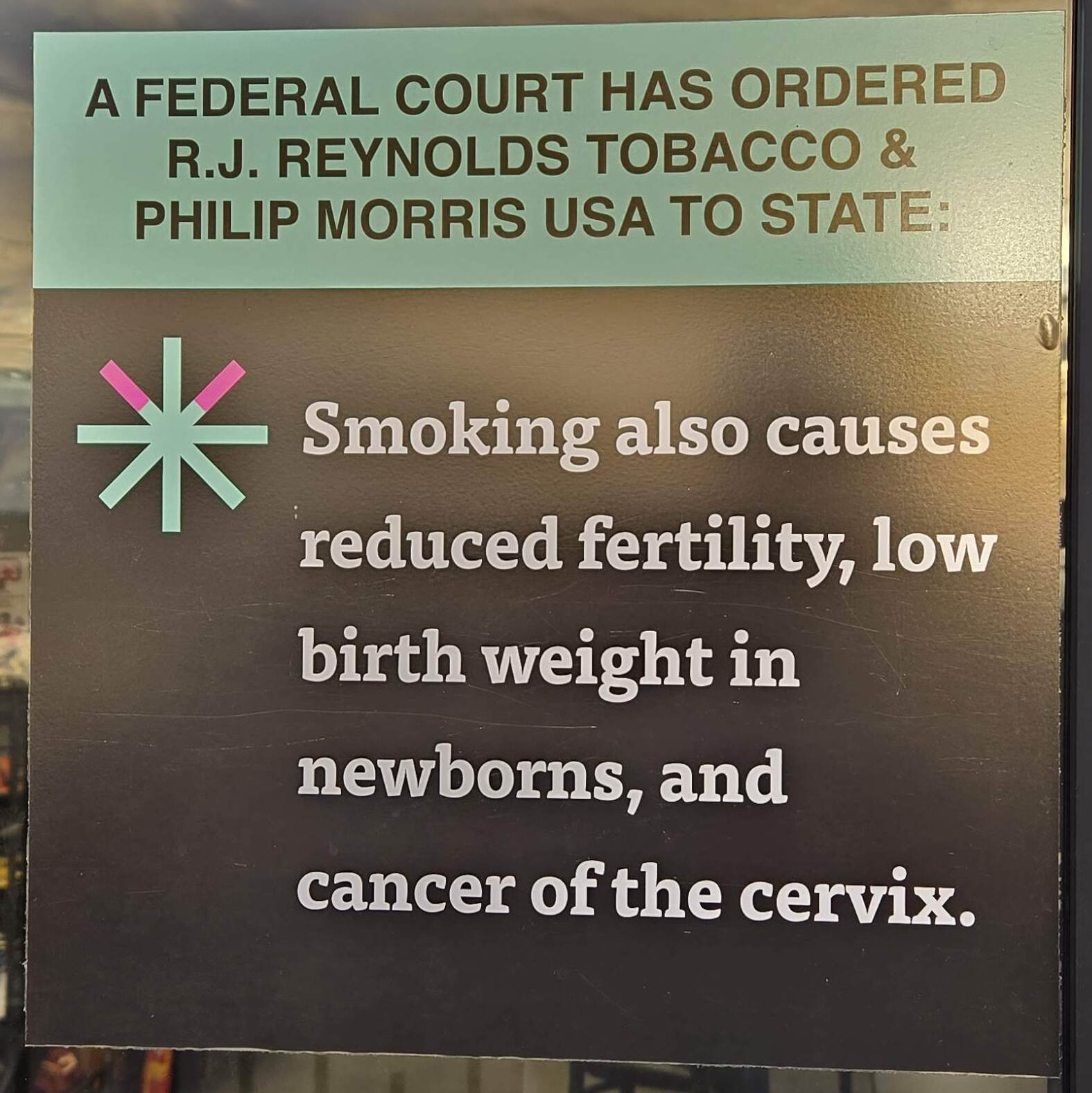
A court-ordered statement: "Smoking also causes reduced fertility" (United States, 2024).

Both first- and second-hand exposure to tobacco and marijuana smoke can damage the testicles and interfere with sperm production. Tobacco contains more than 7000 compounds, of which at least 70 are carcinogenic. Some governments require manufacturers to put warnings on packets.

Cigarette smoke contains both particulate matter such as nicotine and tar and gases such as carbon monoxide (CO). Particulate matter and carbon monoxide are major criteria pollutants, known to have negative effects on male fertility. Nicotine and other components of smoke can cross the blood-testis barrier and harm germ cells and spermatozoa, resulting in decreased measures of sperm health and increases in DNA fragmentation, sperm mutagenesis and genetic abnormalities.

Smoking tobacco increases intake of the heavy metal cadmium, which naturally accumulates in the tobacco plant. When cadmium particles are inhaled, they diffuse from the lungs into the blood stream and circulate throughout the body to various tissues. Cadmium tends to accumulate in the testicles, where it can cause severe structural damage and sperm loss.

==== Pollutants ====
Exposure to environmental pollutants in indoor and outdoor air can affect fertility, fetal development, health of offspring in later life, and the genetics of future generations. Common sources of pollutants include tobacco and marijuana smoke and e-cigarettes.; burning of fossil fuels through vehicle use, heating and cooking; cleaning and personal care products; and microplastics. Steps can be taken to minimize exposures such as avoiding smoking, minimizing dust, using glass instead of plastics, carefully selecting cleaning products and personal care products, and avoiding vehicle exhaust fumes and heavy traffic areas.

The criteria air pollutants sulfur dioxide, nitrogen dioxide, particulate matter (PM_{2.5}, PM_{10}), carbon monoxide, O_{3} and lead have been identified as harmful to human health by the World Health Organization and the U.S. Environmental Protection Agency (EPA) and are known to interfere with reproduction.

A study of counties in China reported a decrease in fertility of 2% for each 10 μg/m^{3} increase in PM_{2.5} exposure. PM_{10}, PM_{2.5} and SO_{2} have been related to decreased total sperm motility. PM_{2.5}, CO, and O_{3} exposure were related to decreases in total sperm number. Studies in Turkey, Poland, and California, among others, have linked exposure to particulate matter with decreases in sperm count and motility and increases in abnormal cell development.

Nitric oxide (NO) is essential to the synthesis and secretion of reproductive hormones. In males, highly specific levels of NO are needed to regulate key functions related to sperm motility, hyperactivation, capacitation, and maturation. As pollutants, nitric oxide (NO) and nitrogen dioxide (NO_{2}) can disrupt these chemically-sensitive activities.

A study in Hefei, China found that sulfur dioxide (SO_{2}) exposure negatively affected progressive motility and total motility of sperm during 0–90 lag days and 70–90 lag days. SO_{2} exposure also had negative effects on sperm concentration and total sperm number during 10–14 lag days.

Endocrine disruptors include both polycyclic aromatic hydrocarbons (PAHs) such as benzo(a)pyrene (BaP) and heavy metals such as lead (Pb), cadmium (Cd), copper (Cu), zinc (Zn) and mercury (Hg). BaP has been reported to reduce sperm motility and increase sperm abnormalities. This effect increases with exposure. Research has demonstrated that more BaPs were found in men with reported fertility issues compared to men without.

Heavy metals such as lead (Pb) and cadmium (Cd) have been found in semen samples. Exposures to heavy metals are linked to lower sperm density, motility, and sperm counts. Heavy metals are also linked to damage to the physical shape and structure of sperm (sperm morphology) and to sperm DNA fragmentation, making sperm less viable.

==== DNA damage ====
Common inherited variants in genes that encode enzymes employed in DNA mismatch repair are associated with increased risk of sperm DNA damage and male infertility. As men age there is a consistent decline in semen quality, and this decline appears to be due to DNA damage. The damage manifests by DNA fragmentation and by the increased susceptibility to denaturation upon exposure to heat or acid, the features characteristic of apoptosis of somatic cells. These findings suggest that DNA damage is an important factor in male infertility.

==== Epigenetic ====
An increasing amount of recent evidence has been recorded documenting abnormal sperm DNA methylation in association with abnormal semen parameters and male infertility. Until recently, scientists have thought that epigenetic markers only affect the individual and are not passed down due to not changing the DNA. New studies suggest environmental factors that changed an individual's epigenetic markers can be seen in their grandchildren, one such study demonstrating this through rats and fertility disruptors. Another study bred rats exposed to an endocrine disruptor, observing effects up to generation F5 including decreased sperm motility and decreased sperm count. These studies suggest that environmental factors that influence fertility can be felt for generations even without changing the DNA.

=== Post-testicular causes ===
Post-testicular factors decrease male fertility due to conditions that affect the male genital system after testicular sperm production and include defects of the genital tract as well as problems in ejaculation:

- Vas deferens obstruction
- Lack of Vas deferens, often related to genetic markers for cystic fibrosis
- Infection, e.g. prostatitis, male accessory gland infection
- Retrograde ejaculation
- Ejaculatory duct obstruction
- Hypospadias
- Impotence

== Diagnostic evaluations ==
The diagnosis of infertility begins with a medical history and physical exam by a physician, physician assistant, or nurse practitioner. Typically two separate semen analyses will be required. The provider may order blood tests to look for hormone imbalances, medical conditions, or genetic issues.

=== Medical history ===
The history should include prior testicular or penile insults (torsion, cryptorchidism, trauma), infections (mumps orchitis, epididymitis), environmental factors, excessive heat, radiation, medications, and drug use (anabolic steroids, selective serotonin reuptake inhibitors, alcohol, smoking). Sexual habits, frequency and timing of intercourse, use of lubricants, and each partner's previous fertility experiences are important. Loss of libido and headaches or visual disturbances may indicate a pituitary tumor.

The past medical or surgical history may reveal thyroid or liver disease (abnormalities of spermatogenesis), diabetic neuropathy (retrograde ejaculation), radical pelvic or retroperitoneal surgery (absent seminal emission secondary to sympathetic nerve injury), or hernia repair (damage to the vas deferens or testicular blood supply).

A family history may reveal genetic problems.

=== Physical examination ===
Usually, the patient disrobes completely and puts on a gown. The physician, physician assistant, or nurse practitioner will perform a thorough examination of the penis, scrotum, testicles, vas deferens, spermatic cords, ejaculatory ducts, urethra, urinary bladder, anus and rectum. An orchidometer can measure testicular volume, which in turn is tightly associated with both sperm and hormonal parameters. A physical exam of the scrotum can reveal a varicocele, but the impact of detecting and surgically correcting a varicocele on sperm parameters or overall male fertility is debated.

=== Sperm sample ===
==== Semen sample obtaining ====
Semen sample obtaining is the first step in spermiogram. The optimal sexual abstinence for semen sample obtaining is of 2–7 days. The first way to obtain the semen sample is through masturbation, and the best place to obtain it is in the same clinic, as this way temperature changes during transport can be avoided, which can be lethal for some spermatozoa.

A single semen sample is not determining for disease diagnosis, so two different samples have to be analyzed with an interval between them of seven days to three months, as sperm production is a cyclic process. It is prudent to ask about possible sample loss, as that could mask true results of spermiogram.

To obtain the sample, a sterile plastic recipient is put directly inside, always no more than one hour before being studied. Conventional preservatives should not be used, as they have chemical substances as lubricants or spermicides that could damage the sample. If preservatives have to be used, for cases of religious ethics in which masturbation is forbidden, a preservative with holes is used. In case of paraplegia it is possible to use mechanic tools or electroejaculation.

The sample should never be obtained through coitus interruptus for several reasons:

- Some part of ejaculation could be lost.
- Bacterial contamination could happen.
- The acid vaginal pH could be deleterious for sperm motility.

Also is very important to label the sample correctly the recipient with patient identification, date, hour, abstinence days, among other data required to be known.

The volume of the semen sample (must be more than 1.5 ml), approximate number of total sperm cells, sperm motility/forward progression, and % of sperm with normal morphology are measured. It is possible to have hyperspermia (high volume more than 6 ml) or Hypospermia (low volume less than 0.5 ml). This is the most common type of fertility testing. Semen deficiencies are often labeled as follows:

- Oligospermia or oligozoospermia – decreased number of spermatozoa in semen
- Aspermia – complete lack of semen
- Hypospermia – reduced seminal volume
- Azoospermia – absence of sperm cells in semen
- Teratospermia – increase in sperm with abnormal morphology
- Asthenozoospermia – reduced sperm motility
- Necrozoospermia – all sperm in the ejaculate are dead
- Leucospermia – a high level of white blood cells in semen
- Normozoospermia or normospermia – It is a result of semen analysis that shows normal values of all ejaculate parameters by WHO but still there are chances of being infertile. This is also called as unexplained Infertility

There are various combinations of these as well, e.g. Teratoasthenozoospermia, which is reduced sperm morphology and motility. Low sperm counts are often associated with decreased sperm motility and increased abnormal morphology, thus the terms "oligoasthenoteratozoospermia" or "oligospermia" can be used as a catch-all.

==== Special obtaining ====
- Psychological inhibition
- Psychotherapy
- Intercourse with special preservatives without lubricants or spermicides. In case of religious limitations, the use of Seminal Collection Devices (SCDs), such as preservatives with holes, is recommended.
- Drug stimulation
- Percutaneous spermatozoa obtaining directly from epididymis, testes, etc.
- Neurological injury
- Vibro-stimulation
- Electro-stimulation
- Retrograde ejaculation
  - This type of ejaculation happens when there is a defect on prostate, so the sample is not ejaculated outside but to the bladder. In that case, sperm is instead collected by neutralizing acidity in the bladder and collecting urine samples after ejaculation.

=== Blood sample ===
Common hormonal test include determination of FSH and testosterone levels. A blood sample can reveal genetic causes of infertility, e.g. Klinefelter syndrome, a Y chromosome microdeletion, or cystic fibrosis.

=== Ultrasonography ===
Scrotal ultrasonography is useful when there is a suspicion of some particular diseases. It may detect signs of testicular dysgenesis, which is often related to an impaired spermatogenesis and to a higher risk of testicular cancer. Scrotum ultrasonography may also detect testicular lesions suggestive of malignancy. A decreased testicular vascularization is characteristic of testicular torsion, whereas hyperemia is often observed in epididymo-orchitis or in some malignant conditions such as lymphoma and leukemia. Doppler ultrasonography useful in assessing venous reflux in case of a varicocele, when palpation is unreliable or in detecting recurrence or persistence after surgery, although the impact of its detection and surgical correction on sperm parameters and overall fertility is debated.

Dilation of the head or tail of the epididymis is suggestive of obstruction or inflammation of the male reproductive tract. Such abnormalities are associated with abnormalities in sperm parameters, as are abnormalities in the texture of the epididymis. Scrotal and transrectal ultrasonography (TRUS) are useful in detecting uni- or bilateral congenital absence of the vas deferens (CBAVD), which may be associated with abnormalities or agenesis of the epididymis, seminal vesicles or kidneys, and indicate the need for testicular sperm extraction. TRUS plays a key role in assessing azoospermia caused by obstruction, and detecting distal CBAVD or anomalies related to obstruction of the ejaculatory duct, such as abnormalities within the duct itself, a median cyst of the prostate (indicating a need for cyst aspiration), or an impairment of the seminal vesicles to become enlarged or emptied.

=== Hyposmotic test ===
To check if the plasma membrane of the sperm is working properly or if it is damaged. To do this, the spermatozoa are placed in a hypotonic medium (low in salts), which causes an osmotic imbalance in the cells, causing the medium to enter the interior of the spermatozoon and swell it. If the sperm membrane is damaged, it will not be functional, so fertilization cannot take place. Hence the relevance of this test.

=== Sperm FISH ===
To check if the spermatozoa have a normal set of chromosomes. It provides great information about the seminal quality of the male. It is performed by marking specific chromosomes of the sperm with fluorescent DNA probes. Some situations in which sperm FISH is indicated are the following:

-Alterations in the karyotype. -Altered seminogram, especially in cases with low concentration or serious morphology problems. -Man undergoing chemotherapy or radiotherapy. -Couples with recurrent miscarriages of unknown cause. -Implantation failure on repeated occasions after applying assisted reproductive techniques. -Couples who have had a child with some chromosomal alteration. Advanced age.

== Prevention ==
Some strategies suggested or proposed for avoiding male infertility include the following:

- Avoiding smoking as it damages sperm DNA
- Avoiding heavy marijuana and alcohol use.
- Avoiding excessive heat to the testes.
- Maintaining optimal frequency of coital activity: sperm counts can be depressed by daily coital activity and sperm motility may be depressed by coital activity that takes place too infrequently (abstinence 10–14 days or more).
- Wearing a protective cup and jockstrap to protect the testicles, in any sport such as baseball, football, cricket, lacrosse, hockey, softball, paintball, rodeo, motocross, wrestling, soccer, karate or other martial arts or any sport where a ball, foot, arm, knee or bat can come into contact with the groin.
- Diet: Healthy diets (i.e. the Mediterranean diet) rich in such nutrients as omega-3 fatty acids, some antioxidants and vitamins, and low in saturated fatty acids (SFAs) and trans-fatty acids (TFAs) are inversely associated with low semen quality parameters. In terms of food groups, fish, shellfish and seafood, poultry, cereals, vegetables and fruits, and low-fat dairy products have been positively related to sperm quality. However, diets rich in processed meat, soy foods, potatoes, full-fat dairy products, coffee, alcohol and sugar-sweetened beverages and sweets have been inversely associated with the quality of semen in some studies. The few studies relating male nutrient or food intake and fecundability also suggest that diets rich in red meat, processed meat, tea and caffeine are associated with a lower rate of fecundability. This association is only controversial in the case of alcohol. The potential biological mechanisms linking diet with sperm function and fertility are largely unknown and require further study.

== Treatment ==
Treatments vary according to the underlying disease and the degree of the impairment of the male's fertility. Further, in an infertility situation, the fertility of the female needs to be considered.

Pre-testicular conditions can often be addressed by medical means or interventions.

Testicular-based male infertility tends to be resistant to medication. Usual approaches include using the sperm for intrauterine insemination (IUI), in vitro fertilization (IVF), or IVF with intracytoplasmatic sperm injection (ICSI). With IVF-ICSI even with a few sperm pregnancies can be achieved.

Obstructive causes of post-testicular infertility can be overcome with either surgery or IVF-ICSI. Ejaculatory factors may be treatable by medication, or by IUI therapy or IVF.

Vitamin E helps counter oxidative stress, which is associated with sperm DNA damage and reduced sperm motility. A hormone-antioxidant combination may improve sperm count and motility. Giving oral antioxidants to men in couples undergoing in vitro fertilisation for male factor or unexplained subfertility may lead to an increase in the live birth rate but overall the risk of adverse effects is unclear.

=== Hormonal therapy ===
Administration of luteinizing hormone (LH) (or human chorionic gonadotropin) and follicle-stimulating hormone (FSH) is very effective in the treatment of male infertility due to hypogonadotropic hypogonadism. Although controversial, off-label clomiphene citrate, an antiestrogen, may also be effective by elevating gonadotropin levels.

Though androgens are absolutely essential for spermatogenesis and therefore male fertility, exogenous testosterone therapy has been found to be ineffective in benefiting men with low sperm count. This is thought to be because very high local levels of testosterone in the testes (concentrations in the seminiferous tubules are 20- to 100-fold greater than circulating levels) are required to mediate spermatogenesis, and exogenous testosterone therapy (which is administered systemically) cannot achieve these required high local concentrations (at least not without extremely supraphysiological dosages). Moreover, exogenous androgen therapy can actually impair or abolish male fertility by suppressing gonadotropin secretion from the pituitary gland, as seen in users of androgens/anabolic steroids (who often have partially or completely suppressed sperm production). This is because suppression of gonadotropin levels results in decreased testicular androgen production (causing diminished local concentrations in the testes) and because FSH is independently critical for spermatogenesis. In contrast to FSH, LH has little role in male fertility outside of inducing gonadal testosterone production.

Estrogen, at some concentration, has been found to be essential for male fertility/spermatogenesis. However, estrogen levels that are too high can impair male fertility by suppressing gonadotropin secretion and thereby diminishing intratesticular androgen levels. As such, clomiphene citrate (an antiestrogen) and aromatase inhibitors such as testolactone or anastrozole have shown effectiveness in benefiting spermatogenesis.

Low-dose estrogen and testosterone combination therapy may improve sperm count and motility in some men, including in men with severe oligospermia.

== Research ==
Researchers at Münster University developed in vitro culture conditions using a three-dimensional agar culture system which induces mouse testicular germ cells to reach the final stages of spermatogenesis, including spermatozoa generation. If reproduced in humans, this could potentially enable infertile men to father children with their own sperm.

Researchers from Montana State University developed precursors of sperm from skin cells of infertile men.

Sharpe et al. comment on the success of intracytoplasmic sperm injection (ICSI) in women saying, "[t]hus, the woman carries the treatment burden for male infertility, a fairly unique scenario in medical practice. Ironically, ICSI's success has effectively diverted attention from identifying what causes male infertility and focused research onto the female, to optimize the provision of eggs and a receptive endometrium, on which ICSI's success depends."

== Prevalence ==
Currently, there are no solid numbers on how many couples worldwide experience infertility, but the World Health Organization estimates between 60 and 80 million couples are affected. The population in different regions have varying amounts of infertility.

Starting in the late 20th century, scientists have expressed concerns about the declining semen quality in men. A study was done in 1992 with men who had never experienced infertility showed that the amount of sperm in semen had declined by 1% per year since 1938. Further research a few years later also confirmed the decline in sperm count and also seminal volume. Various studies in Finland, Southern Tunisia, and Argentina also showed a decline in sperm count, motility, morphology, and seminal volume.

Males from India had a 30.3% decline in sperm count, 22.9% decline in sperm motility, and a 51% decrease in morphology over a span of a decade. Doctors in India disclosed that the sperm count of a fertile Indian male had decreased by a third over a span of three decades. Some factors may include exposure to high temperatures at places such as factories. A 1 degree increase in temperature will reduce 14% of spermatogenesis.

Researchers in Calcutta conducted a study between 1981 and 1985 that also showed a decrease in sperm motility and seminal volume, but no change in sperm concentration.

== Society and culture ==
There are a variety of social stigmas that surround male infertility throughout the world. The condition and its effects on both men and women is the topic for example of the novel set in Nigeria entitled, The Secret Lives of Baba Segi's Wives. A lot of research has pointed to the relationship between infertility and emasculation. This association has led to infertility being less studied and diagnosed in men over time. In places like Egypt, Zimbabwe, and Mexico, erectile dysfunction, also known as impotence, is considered a determinant of infertility. When stereotypical ideals of manhood are virility and strength, men sharing problems of infertility can face feelings of inadequacy, unworthiness, and have thoughts of suicide. In many cases, a variety of socio-economic interventions come in play to determine penile activity. For the Shona people, since impotence is linked to infertility, an examination to check on the penile function spans from infancy to post marriage. At infancy, there are daily check-ups by the mothers on the son's erection and urine quality. When the son reaches puberty, they are asked to ejaculate in river banks and for their male elders to examine sperm quality. The traditions last until post-marriage, when the family of the bride take part to check on consummation and the groom's sperm quality.

== Crisis ==
The male infertility crisis is an increase in male infertility since the mid-1970s. The issue attracted media attention after a 2017 meta-analysis found that sperm counts in Western countries had declined by 52.4 percent between 1973 and 2011. The decline is particularly prevalent in Western regions such as New Zealand, Australia, Europe, and North America. A 2022 meta-analysis noted declines in additional countries in Asia, Africa, Central America, and South America. This meta-analysis also suggests that the decline in sperm counts may be accelerating.

This decline in male fertility is the subject of research and debate. Proposed explanations include lifestyle factors, such as changes in diet and physical activity levels, and increased exposure to endocrine disrupting chemicals, such as those found in plastics and pesticides. Several studies also indicate that sustained periods of high ambient temperature consistently lower the quality of sperm in animals. Some scientists have questioned the extent of the crisis; the scientific community, however, generally acknowledges increasing male infertility as a men's-health issue.

== See also ==
- Female infertility
- Fertility preservation
- Fertility testing
- Infertility
- Male accessory gland infection (MAGI)
- Meiosis
- Oncofertility
- Paternal age effect
- Spermatogenesis
- Sterility
- Vasectomy
