= Ovum quality =

Ovum quality is the measure of the ability of an oocyte (the female gamete) to achieve successful fertilisation and develop into a viable embryo. The quality is determined by metabolic and chromosomal competency of the oocyte, which are susceptible to various factors which impact quality and thus reproductive success. This is of significance as an embryo's development is more heavily reliant on the oocyte in comparison to the sperm.

== Factors ==
=== Age ===
Advanced maternal age represents a significant consideration for ovum health, and is currently regarded as the largest risk factor underlying instances of aneuploidy in human populations. The mechanisms by which ovum health degenerates with age are incompletely understood. Extended meiotic arrest, a decline in mitochondrial function, and oxidative stress are key factors associated with ageing that are damaging to oocyte quality, identified in studies using both human and animal oocytes.

==== Meiotic arrest and loss of cohesion ====
The formation of human gametes involves two separation events, known distinctly as Meiosis I, in which paired homologous chromosomes are separated, and Meiosis II, in which sister chromatids are divided. Meiosis I is a slightly elongated process, during which homologous chromosomes align, pair, and recombine.

While male gametes (sperm) are continuously produced throughout life, the female ovarian reserve is fully formed during early development. Oocytes (but not spermatocytes) then undergo a prolonged arrest at the end of diplotene, until meiosis resumes at the beginning of the menstrual cycle. It is during this prolonged arrest that age-dependent changes or deterioration may occur.

During the oocyte's prolonged arrest, chromosomes exist as bivalents. This means that homologous chromosomes have paired, and are being held together by chiasmata (the physical crossovers between chromosome arms). The cohesin complex, a ring like structure associated with sister chromatids, helps to hold them in close proximity, therefore generating sister chromatid cohesion. This cohesion is later broken by the enzyme separase, allowing the chiasmata to be broken and homologous chromosomes to segregate in a normal way. Age-related degeneration of the inhibitors and regulators of separase, may lead to inappropriate and premature cohesin degradation before anaphase. As a result, homologous chromosomes may align independently on the meiotic spindle, risking aneuploidy that represents a key mechanism of reduced reproductive success.

==== Mitochondrial changes ====
As the most mitochondria-dense cells in the body, ova depend upon these organelles for early embryonic development, proliferation and their competence for fertilisation. Therefore, age-related changes to mitochondrial function naturally represent a significant influence on ovum quality and female fertility.

Specific changes that occur with age include a reduction in quantity of mitochondrial DNA, as well as an increase in mitochondrial DNA mutations. Animal studies have demonstrated these genetic abnormalities, in addition to physical changes in the mitochondria themselves and reduced ATP production. Further investigation is required to establish definitive evidence for decreasing developmental potential as a result of aging mitochondria, however the accumulation of mitochondrial abnormalities over time in the female ovum has been established, and appears linked in some way to declining ova health.

=== Obesity ===
Studies show that obesity affects the quality of the ovum. It is a disease which decreases the fertility of the female. This is mainly due to causing a disturbance to maternal hormonal levels. It is also possible for the uterus to have different levels of receptivity with regards to oocyte attachment, as a result of a disturbance to the function of the endometrium. Furthermore, ingesting higher levels of carbohydrates and increased levels of glucose in the diet has been related to a higher chance of infertility because of the ovary failing to release oocytes at ovulation. Obesity also has been linked to early miscarriages, deaths of the foetus, new-born or deaths where the baby is born dead and there is an increased chance of the babies having birth defects.

In the IVF procedure a hormone called gonadotropin (GnRH) is given to the female to stimulate the ovaries to release oocytes. In obese patients, their obesity negatively affects the ovaries responsiveness to this hormonal stimulant leading to doctors having to administrate an increased dose of the hormone and the duration of stimulation is increased. Less mature oocytes are harvested. Moreover, obesity leads to decreased pregnancy rates after IVF and a smaller chance of the oocyte implanting to the uterine wall. They also have an increased chance of the cycle being cancelled.

==== Damage from lipotoxicity ====
An overload of fatty acids in the body due to increased ingestion can lead to lipotoxicity. These extra fatty acids are not stored by the body and instead they circulate and damage the surrounding tissue. Levels of excess Fatty acids are higher in obese women. The fatty acid will damage other cells, except for the adipocytes, by producing more reactive oxygen species. This causes the cell to self-destruct (apoptosis).

=== Stress ===
==== Psychological stress ====
Psychological stress can contribute both directly and indirectly to decreased oocyte quality. Increased stress leads to an increased production and release of cortisol, a stress hormone, which directly inhibits the biosynthesis of estradiol in the ovary. A decrease in estradiol as well as oxidative stress leads to apoptosis of the granulosa cells off the oocyte which deteriorates oocyte quality.
