= Apoptotic DNA fragmentation =

Cleavage of DNA into tiny pieces during apoptosis

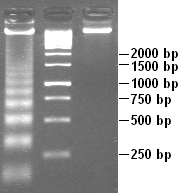
Apoptotic DNA fragmentation, visualised by the DNA laddering assay (left). A 1 kb marker (middle) and control DNA (right) are included for comparison.

Apoptotic DNA fragmentation is a key feature of apoptosis, a type of programmed cell death. Apoptosis is characterized by the activation of endogenous endonucleases, particularly the caspase-3 activated DNase (CAD), with subsequent cleavage of nuclear DNA into internucleosomal fragments of roughly 180 base pairs (bp) and multiples thereof (360, 540 etc.). The apoptotic DNA fragmentation is being used as a marker of apoptosis and for identification of apoptotic cells either via the DNA laddering assay, the TUNEL assay, or the by detection of cells with fractional DNA content ("sub G_{1} cells") on DNA content frequency histograms e.g. as in the Nicoletti assay.

== Mechanism ==
The enzyme responsible for apoptotic DNA fragmentation is the Caspase-Activated DNase (CAD). CAD is normally inhibited by another protein, the Inhibitor of Caspase Activated DNase (ICAD). During apoptosis, the apoptotic effector caspase, caspase-3, cleaves ICAD and thus causes CAD to become activated.

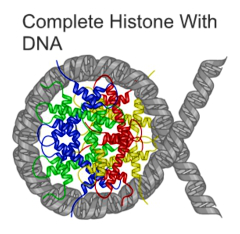
A nucleosome, consisting of DNA (grey) wrapped around a histone tetramer (coloured). In apoptotic DNA fragmentation, the DNA is cleaved in the internucleosomal linker region, which is the part of the DNA not wrapped around the histones.

CAD cleaves DNA at internucleosomal linker sites between nucleosomes, protein-containing structures that occur in chromatin at ~180-bp intervals. This is because the DNA is normally tightly wrapped around histones, the core proteins of the nucleosomes. The linker sites are the only parts of the DNA strand that are exposed and thus accessible to CAD.

Degradation of nuclear DNA into nucleosomal units is one of the hallmarks of apoptotic cell death. It occurs in response to various apoptotic stimuli in a wide variety of cell types. Molecular characterization of this process identified a specific DNase (CAD, caspase-activated DNase) that cleaves chromosomal DNA in a caspase-dependent manner. CAD is synthesized with the help of ICAD (inhibitor of CAD), which works as a specific chaperone for CAD and is found complexed with ICAD in proliferating cells. When cells are induced to undergo apoptosis, caspase 3 cleaves ICAD to dissociate the CAD:ICAD complex, allowing CAD to cleave chromosomal DNA. Cells that lack ICAD or that express caspase-resistant mutant ICAD thus do not show DNA fragmentation during apoptosis, although they do exhibit some other features of apoptosis and die.

Even though much work has been performed on the analysis of apoptotic events, little information is available to link the timing of morphological features at the cell surface and in the nucleus to the biochemical degradation of DNA in the same cells. Apoptosis can be initiated by a myriad of different mechanisms in different cell types, and the kinetics of these events vary widely, from only a few minutes to several days depending on the cell system. The presence or absence of particular apoptotic event(s), including DNA fragmentation, depends on the "time window" at which the kinetic process of apoptosis is being investigated. Often this may complicate identification of apoptotic cells if cell populations are analyzed only at a single time point e.g. after induction of apoptosis.

== Historical background ==
The discovery of the internucleosomal fragmentation of genomic DNA to regular repeating oligonucleosomal fragments generated by Ca/Mg-dependent endonuclease is accepted as one of the best-characterized biochemical markers of apoptosis (programmed cell death).

In 1970, Williamson described that cytoplasmic DNA isolated from mouse liver cells after culture was characterized by DNA fragments with a molecular weight consisting of multiples of 135 kDa. This finding was consistent with the hypothesis that these DNA fragments were a specific degradation product of nuclear DNA. In 1972, Kerr, Wyllie, and Currie coined the term apoptosis and distinguished this type of cell death from necrosis based on morphological features. In 1973, Hewish and Burgoyne, during the study of subchromatin structure, found that chromatin is accessible to the Ca^{++}/Mg^{++} endonuclease, resulting in the formation of a digestion product with a regular series of molecular weight similar to the one previously described by Williamson (1970). In 1974, Williams, Little, and Shipley, using cells exposed to widely differing types of trauma, found that during cell death, degraded DNA in "every case had a modal value of between 10(x6) and 10(x7) Dalton and cellular metabolism is required to produce degradation of DNA". However, this observation was without indication of "whether the incision attack on the DNA molecule was a random or rather at a particular site, that have structural or functional meaning". In 1976, Scalka, Matyasova, and Cejkova described internucleosomal fragmentation of irradiated lymphoid chromatin DNA in vivo.

Six years passed from 1972 to 1978/1980 until the discovery and evaluation of internucleosomal fragmentation of DNA during apoptotic cell death as a hallmark of apoptosis. Since 1972 (Kerr, Wyllie, and Currie), it is accepted that glucocorticoid-induced death of lymphocytes is a form of apoptosis. In 1978, Zakharyan and Pogosyan presented a paper revealing that glucocorticoid-induced DNA degradation in rat lymphoid tissue, thymus, and spleen occurred in a specific pattern producing fragments of DNA that were electrophoretically similar to those observed after treatment of chromatin with microccoccal nuclease, which indicated internucleosomal cleavage pattern of DNA degradation occurred during apoptosis. Thus, the first link between programmed cell death/apoptosis and internucleosomal fragmentation of chromatin DNA was discovered and soon became as a specific feature of apoptosis.

In 1980, Wyllie reported additional evidence for an internucleosomal DNA cleavage pattern as a specific feature of glucocorticoid-treated thymocytes undergoing apoptosis. The internucleosomal DNA cleavage pattern was observed as a specific feature of apoptosis in 1978/1980 and has become a recognised hallmark of programmed cell death since then. In 1992 Gorczyca et al. ^{[3]} and Gavrieli et al.^{[4]} independently described the DNA fragmentation assay based on the use of the terminal deoxynucleotidyl transferase (TUNEL) which become one of the standard methods to detect and identify apoptotic cells.

== Detection assays ==
Flow cytometry is most frequently used to detect apoptotic DNA fragmentation. Analysis of DNA content by flow cytometry can identify apoptotic cells with fragmented DNA as the cells with fractional DNA content, often called the sub-G_{1} cells. The flow-cytometric assay utilizing the fluorochrome acridine orange shows that DNA fragmentation within individual cells is discontinuous likely reflecting different levels of restriction in accessibility of DNA to DNase, by the supranucleosomal and nucleosomal levels of chromatin structure. The presence of apoptotic "sub-G_{1}cells" can also be detected in cells pre-fixed in ethanol but not after fixation in the crosslinking fixatives such as formaldehyde. The late-S and G_{2} apoptotic cells may not be detected with this approach because their fractional DNA content may overlap with that of the non-apoptotic G_{1} cells. Treatment of cells with detergent, prior or concurrently with DNA fluorochrome, also reveals DNA fragmentation by virtue of the presence of the sub-G_{1} cells or cell fragments, as defined by Nicoletti et al.^{[5]}

Apoptotic DNA fragmentation can also be detected by the TUNEL assay. The fluorochrome-based TUNEL assay applicable for flow cytometry, correlates the detection of DNA strand breaks with the cellular DNA content and thus with cell cycle-phase position. The avidin-peroxidase labeling TUNEL assay is applicable for light absorption microscopy. Many TUNEL-related kits are commercially available. Apoptotic DNA fragmentation is also analyzed using agarose gel electrophoresis to demonstrate a "ladder" pattern at ~180-BP intervals.^{[1]} Necrosis, on the other hand, is usually characterized by random DNA fragmentation which forms a "smear" on agarose gels.

== See also ==
- Caspase-activated DNase
- DNA laddering
