= DNA fragmentation =

Separation or breakage of DNA strands into pieces

DNA fragmentation is the separation or breaking of DNA strands into pieces. It can be done intentionally by laboratory personnel or by cells, or can occur spontaneously. Spontaneous or accidental DNA fragmentation is fragmentation that gradually accumulates in a cell. It can be measured by e.g. the comet assay or by the TUNEL assay.

Its main units of measurement is the DNA Fragmentation Index (DFI). A DFI of 20% or more significantly reduces the success rates after ICSI.

DNA fragmentation was first documented by Williamson in 1970 when he observed discrete oligomeric fragments occurring during cell death in primary neonatal liver cultures. He described the cytoplasmic DNA isolated from mouse liver cells after culture as characterized by DNA fragments with a molecular weight consisting of multiples of 135 kDa. This finding was consistent with the hypothesis that these DNA fragments were a specific degradation product of nuclear DNA.

== Intentional ==
DNA fragmentation is often necessary prior to library construction or subcloning for DNA sequences. A variety of methods involving the mechanical breakage of DNA have been employed where DNA is fragmented by laboratory personnel. Such methods include sonication, needle shear, nebulisation, point-sink shearing and passage through a pressure cell.

- Restriction digest is the intentional laboratory breaking of DNA strands. It is an enzyme-based treatment used in biotechnology to cut DNA into smaller strands in order to study fragment length differences among individuals or for gene cloning. This method fragments DNA either by the simultaneous cleavage of both strands, or by generation of nicks on each strand of dsDNA to produce dsDNA breaks.
- Acoustic shearing of the transmission of high-frequency acoustic energy waves delivered to a DNA library. The transducer is bowl shaped so that the waves converge at the target of interest.
- Nebulization forces DNA through a small hole in a nebulizer unit, which results in the formation of a fine mist that is collected. Fragment size is determined by the pressure of the gas used to push the DNA through the nebulizer, the speed at which the DNA solution passes through the hole, the viscosity of the solution, and the temperature.
- Sonication, a type of hydrodynamic shearing, subjects DNA to acoustic cavitation and hydrodynamic shearing by exposure to brief periods of sonication, usually resulting in 700bp fragments. For DNA fragmentation, sonication is commonly applied at burst cycles using a probe-type sonicator.
- Point-sink shearing, a type of hydrodynamic shearing, uses a syringe pump to create hydrodynamic shear forces by pushing a DNA library through a small abrupt contraction. About 90% of fragment lengths fall within a two-fold range.
- Needle shearing creates shearing forces by passing DNA libraries through small gauge needle. The DNA pass through a gauge needle several times to physically tear the DNA into fine pieces.
- French pressure cells pass DNA through a narrow valve under high pressure to create high shearing forces. With a French press, the shear force can be carefully modulated by adjusting the piston pressure. The Press provides a single pass through the point of maximum shear force, limiting damage to delicate biological structures due to repeated shear, as occurs in other disruption methods.
- In transposome mediated fragmentation (tagmentation) transposomes are prepared with DNA that is afterwards cut so that the transposition events result in fragmented DNA with adapters (instead of an insertion). The relative concentration of transposomes and DNA must be appropriate.

== Spontaneous ==
Apoptotic DNA fragmentation is a natural fragmentation that cells perform in apoptosis (programmed cell death). DNA fragmentation is a biochemical hallmark of apoptosis. In dying cells, DNA is cleaved by an endonuclease that fragments the chromatin into nucleosomal units, which are multiples of about 180-bp oligomers and appear as a DNA ladder when run on an agarose gel. The enzyme responsible for apoptotic DNA fragmentation is the Caspase-activated DNase. CAD is normally inhibited by another protein, the Inhibitor of Caspase Activated DNase (ICAD). During apoptosis, the apoptotic effector caspase, caspase 3, cleaves ICAD and thus causes CAD to become activated.

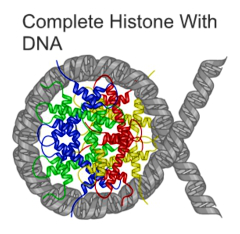
A nucleosome, consisting of DNA (grey) wrapped around a histone tetramer (coloured). In apoptotic DNA fragmentation, the DNA is cleaved in the internucleosomal linker region, which is the part of the DNA not wrapped around the histones.

CAD cleaves the DNA at the internucleosomal linker sites between the nucleosomes, protein-containing structures that occur in chromatin at ~180-bp intervals. This is because the DNA is normally tightly wrapped around histones, the core proteins of the nucleosomes. The linker sites are the only parts of the DNA strand that are exposed and thus accessible to CAD.

Men with sperm motility defects often have high levels of sperm DNA fragmentation. The degree of DNA fragmentation in sperm cells can predict outcomes for in vitro fertilization (IVF) and its expansion intracytoplasmic sperm injection (ICSI). The sperm chromatin dispersion test (SCD) and TUNEL assay are both effective in detecting sperm DNA damage. Using bright-field microscopy, the SCD test appears to be more sensitive than the TUNEL assay.

== Uses ==
DNA Fragmentation plays an important part in forensics, especially that of DNA profiling.

- Restriction Fragment Length Polymorphism (RFLP) is a technique for analyzing the variable lengths of DNA fragments that result from digesting a DNA sample with a restriction endonuclease. The restriction endonuclease cuts DNA at a specific sequence pattern known as a restriction endonuclease recognition site. The presence or absence of certain recognition sites in a DNA sample generates variable lengths of DNA fragments, which are separated using gel electrophoresis. They are then hybridized with DNA probes that bind to a complementary DNA sequence in the sample.
- In polymerase chain reaction (PCR) analysis, millions of exact copies of DNA from a biological sample are made. It used to amplify a specific region of a DNA strand (the DNA target). Most PCR methods typically amplify DNA fragments of between 0.1 and 10 kilo base pairs (kb), although some techniques allow amplification of fragments up to 40 kb in size. PCR also uses heat to separate the DNA strands.
- DNA fragmented during apoptosis, of a size from 1 to 20 nucleosomes, can be selectively isolated from the cells fixed in the denaturing fixative ethanol
