= Monocrotophos =

Names
- Preferred IUPAC name Dimethyl (2E)-4-(methylamino)-4-oxobut-2-en-2-yl phosphate
- Other names 3-Hydroxy-N-methylcrotonamide dimethylphosphate, Monocron

Identifiers
CAS Number	6923-22-4
3D model (JSmol)	Interactive image
ChEBI	CHEBI:38728
ChemSpider	4522053
ECHA InfoCard	100.027.311
KEGG	C18663
PubChem CID	5371562
UNII	5Q3PE07Z18
CompTox Dashboard (EPA)	DTXSID9034816
- InChI: InChI=1S/C7H14NO5P/c1-6(5-7(9)8-2)13-14(10,11-3)12-4/h5H,1-4H3,(H,8,9)/b6-5+ Key: KRTSDMXIXPKRQR-AATRIKPKSA-N; InChI=1/C7H14NO5P/c1-6(5-7(9)8-2)13-14(10,11-3)12-4/h5H,1-4H3,(H,8,9)/b6-5+ Key: KRTSDMXIXPKRQR-AATRIKPKBN
- SMILES: O=P(O/C(=C/C(=O)NC)C)(OC)OC

Properties
Chemical formula	C_{7}H_{14}NO_{5}P
Molar mass	223.2 g/mol
Appearance	Colorless to reddish-brown solid
Odor	Mild, ester-like
Density	1.33 g/cm^{3}
Melting point	55 °C (131 °F; 328 K)
Boiling point	120 °C (248 °F; 393 K) .0005 mmHg
Solubility in water	miscible
Vapor pressure	0.000007 mmHg (20°C)

Hazards
- Occupational safety and health (OHS/OSH)
Main hazards	blood cholinesterase
Flash point	> 93 °C; 200 °F; 366 K
- NIOSH (US health exposure limits)
PEL (Permissible)	none
REL (Recommended)	TWA 0.25 mg/m^{3}
IDLH (Immediate danger)	N.D.
- Except where otherwise noted, data are given for materials in their standard state (at 25 °C [77 °F], 100 kPa). verify (what is ?) Infobox references

Monocrotophos is an organophosphate insecticide. It is acutely toxic to birds and humans, so it has been banned in the U.S., the E.U., India and many other countries.

== Uses ==
Monocrotophos is principally used in agriculture, as a relatively cheap pesticide. However, it is also used frequently as a tool to commit suicide. It is used as a pesticide for cucumber.

Monocrotophos is believed to be the contaminant responsible for the death of 23 schoolchildren in a Bihar, India school. They ate a state-provided school lunch in the district of Saran in India in July 2013 which was prepared in oil kept in the container of this pesticide.

== Toxicity ==
=== To wildlife ===
Widespread bird kills, including a large kill of Swainson's Hawks in Argentina, have resulted from the use of monocrotophos.

=== Diabetogen ===
In a study published in Genome Biology, researchers demonstrated the gut microbiota mediated diabetogenic effect of organophosphate insecticides. They used monocrotophos as the prototypical organophosphate in their study and showcased that during chronic intake, monocrotophos is degraded by the gut microbiota and the end products are converted to glucose via gluconeogenesis that account for glucose intolerance. All the studies were validated in human samples from the villages in Madurai.

=== Cardiotoxicity ===
In a recent study, Wistar rats were administered 1/50 of LD_{50} dosage of monocrotophos (0.36 mg/kg body weight) orally via gavage daily for three weeks. Animals administered Monocrotophos exhibited mild hyperglycemia and dyslipidemia in the blood. Cardiac oxidative stress was conferred by accumulation of protein carbonyls, lipid peroxidation and glutathione production. The cardiac markers (cTn-I, CK-MB and LDH) showed elevated levels in blood plasma, which indicates cardiac tissue damage. The histopathology of the heart tissue authenticated the monocrotophos induced tissue damage by showing signs of nonspecific inflammatory changes and edema between muscle fibres. Thus the findings of this preliminary study illustrate the cardiotoxic effect of prolonged monocrotophos intake in rats and suggest that MCP can be a possible independent and potent environmental cardiovascular risk factor.

=== Acute effects ===
Nerve growth factor (50 ng/ml) induced functional differentiation in PC12 cells has been reported. The studies have been carried out showing mitochondria mediated apoptosis in PC12 cells exposed to monocrotophos. A significant induction in reactive oxygen species, lipid peroxides, and the ratio of glutathione disulfide/reduced glutathione was observed in cells exposed to selected doses of monocrotophos. Following the exposure of PC12 cells to monocrotophos, the levels of protein and mRNA expression of caspase-3, caspase-9, BAX, p53, p21, PUMA, and cytochrome-c were significantly upregulated, whereas the levels of Bcl-2, Bcl-w, and Mcl-1 were downregulated. TUNEL assay, DNA laddering, and micronuclei induction show that long-term exposure of PC12 cells to monocrotophos at higher concentration (10^{−5} M) decreases the number of apoptotic events due to an increase in the number of necrotic cells. Monocrotophos-induced translocation of BAX and cytochrome-c proteins between the cytoplasm and mitochondria confirmed the role of monocrotophos in the permeability of the mitochondrial membrane. Mitochondria mediated apoptosis induction was confirmed by the increased activity of caspase cascade. These apoptotic changes could be correlated with elevated levels of expression of selected cytochrome P450s (CYP1A1/1A2, 2B1/2B2, 2E1) in PC12 cells exposed to monocrotophos (10^{−5} M).
