= Prodioctes haematicus =

Scientific classification
- Kingdom: Animalia
- Phylum: Arthropoda
- Class: Insecta
- Order: Coleoptera
- Suborder: Polyphaga
- Infraorder: Cucujiformia
- Family: Curculionidae
- Genus: Prodioctes
- Species: P. haematicus

Binomial name
- Prodioctes haematicus L.A.A.Chevrolat, 1885

Species of beetle

Prodioctes haematicus, commonly known as rhizome weevil, is a species of weevil native to India and Sri Lanka. It is a common pest on cardamom and ginger.

== Description ==
This small weevil has a body length of 12 mm. Adult is brown in color.

== Biology ==
Adult weevil lays eggs in the cavities made on rhizome. Egg period is about 8 to 10 days. Grub is usually found inside the rhizome where they make tunnels and feed on the rhizome causing death of entire clumps of cardamom. Grub period is about 21 days. Larvae become full fed within three weeks. Final grub starts to pupate in the feeding tunnels. Pupal period lasts for 21 days. Lifespan of the adult is about 7 to 8 months. Adult completes only one generation in a year. Grub infestation is severe in the secondary nursery during November to January.

Grubs are also known to attack rhizomes of ginger where grubs bore into the pseudostem and cause dead hearts.

== Control ==
Adults and final grubs can be control by hand picking. Affected plants and seedlings can be destroyed and burn. Otherwise, base of the clump can be treated with chlorpyrifos, malathion or carbaryl pesticides. Infected ginger plants can be treated with monocrotophos, fenitrothion, endosulfan, nimbicidine or carbofuran 3G granules immediately after mother rhizome extraction.
