= DFFB =

DFFB may refer to:

- Deutsche Film- und Fernsehakademie Berlin
- A human gene that encodes the caspase-activated DNase protein
