= DNA laddering =

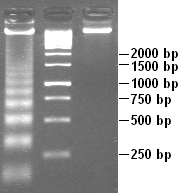
DNA laddering (left) visualised in an agarose gel by ethidium bromide staining. A 1 kb marker (middle) and control DNA (right) are included.

DNA laddering is a feature that can be observed when DNA fragments resulting from apoptotic DNA fragmentation are visualized after separation by gel electrophoresis, first described in 1980 by Andrew Wyllie at the University of Edinburgh Medical School. DNA fragments can also be detected in cells that underwent necrosis, but when these DNA fragments are subjected to gel electrophoresis after separation, no clear "ladder" pattern is apparent.

== DNA degradation ==
DNA laddering is a distinctive feature of DNA degraded by caspase-activated DNase (CAD), which is a key event during apoptosis. CAD cleaves genomic DNA at internucleosomal linker regions, resulting in DNA fragments that are multiples of 180–185 base-pairs in length. Separation of the fragments by agarose gel electrophoresis and subsequent visualization, for example by ethidium bromide staining, results in a characteristic "ladder" pattern. A simple method of selective extraction of fragmented DNA from apoptotic cells without the presence of high molecular weight DNA sections, generating the laddering pattern, utilizes pretreatment of cells in ethanol.

== Apoptosis and necrosis ==
While most of the morphological features of apoptotic cells are short-lived, DNA laddering can be used as final state read-out method and has therefore become a reliable method to distinguish apoptosis from necrosis. DNA laddering can also be used to see if cells underwent apoptosis in the presence of a virus. This is useful because it can help determine the effects a virus has on a cell.

DNA laddering can only be used to detect apoptosis during the later stages of apoptosis. This is due to DNA fragmentation taking place in a later stage of the apoptosis process. DNA laddering is used to test for apoptosis of many cells, and is not accurate at testing for only a few cells that committed apoptosis. To enhance the accuracy in testing for apoptosis, other assays are used along with DNA laddering such as TEM and TUNEL. With recent improvements to DNA laddering, DNA laddering has become a more reliable, and reasonable technique to use when detecting apoptosis. It is also important to note that DNA laddering occurs differently depending on the type of cell, so there may be slight changes in the process of DNA laddering depending on the cell that is being investigated.

== See also ==
- Apoptotic DNA fragmentation
- Caspase-activated DNase
- Nicoletti assay
- TUNEL assay
