= Bihar school meal poisoning incident =

2013 fatal insecticide poisoning in India

- Location of Bihar in India
- Date: 16 July 2013
- Location: Dharmasati Mata School, Gandama village, Mashrakh town, state of Bihar India; 26°06′19″N 84°44′23″E
- Cause: Food adulteration and yellow phosphorus poisoning
- Deaths: 23

On 16 July 2013, 23–27 students died, and dozens more fell ill at a primary school in the village of Gandaman in the Saran district of the Indian state of Bihar after eating a Midday Meal contaminated with pesticide. Angered by the deaths and illnesses, villagers took to the streets in many parts of the district in violent protest. Subsequently, the Bihar government took a series of steps to prevent any recurrence of such incidents.

== Background ==
Across India, the Midday Meal Scheme provides roughly 120 million children with free lunch, making it the world's most extensive school lunch program. In spite of corruption involved in implementing the scheme, it aims to fight widespread poverty and improve children's school attendance and health as a large number of India's children suffer from malnutrition.

Bihar in northern India is among the nation's poorest states. According to Mashrakh residents, students have suffered from food poisoning after eating school lunches on multiple occasions. P. K. Shahi, Bihar's education minister, said complaints about food quality were not uncommon, but there had been no reported incidents of widespread food poisoning during his tenure. The nonprofit Hare Krishna Food for Life describes the meal programmes in Bihar and neighbouring Uttar Pradesh as "the worst in India." Public health is poor in general, with most water sources contaminated, and hospitals underfunded.

The primary school Dharmashati-Mata Mandir, in the village of Gandaman, was established in 2010. At the time of the incident, 89 children were registered with the school. The food material for Midday Meals was stored in the residence of the headmistress as the school did not have sufficient infrastructure for storage.

== Incident ==
On 16 July 2013, children aged between four and twelve years at the Dharmashati Mata primary school complained that their lunch, served as a part of the Midday Meal Scheme, tasted odd. The headmistress rebuked children who questioned the food. Earlier, headmistress Meena Kumari had been informed by the school's cook that the new cooking oil was discoloured and smelled odd. Kumari replied that the oil was purchased at a local grocery store and safe to use. The cook, who was also hospitalized by the poisoning, later told reporters that it looked like there was "an accumulation of residual waste at the bottom [of the oil jar]". The meal cooked at the school that day consisted of soya beans, rice and potato curry.

Thirty minutes after eating the meal, the children complained of stomach pain and soon after were taken ill with vomiting and diarrhoea. The number of sick children overwhelmed the school and the local medical system. Some of the sick children were sent home, forcing their parents to seek help on their own. According to the official count, 23 children died as a result of the contaminated food. Parents and local villagers said at least 27 had died. Sixteen children died on-site, and four others were declared dead upon arrival at the local hospital. Others died in hospital. Among the dead were two children of one of the schools cooks, Panna Devi; her third child survived. A total of 48 students fell ill from the contaminated food. Three remained in a critical condition as of 17 July. Thirty-one children were moved from the local hospital to Patna Medical College Hospital (PMCH) for further treatment.

== Cause ==
Initial indications were that the food was contaminated by an organophosphate, a class of chemicals commonly found in insecticides, pesticides and herbicides. A local government administrator commented "It appears to be a case of poisoning but we will have to wait for forensic reports ... Had it been a case of natural food poisoning, so many children would not have died." Dr Amar Kant Jha, superintendent of PMCH in Patna, said that the survivors were emitting toxic vapours, which led his team to suspect almost immediately that they had been poisoned with an organophosphate.

Late on 17 July, officials stated that they believed the cooking oil had been placed in a container formerly used to store insecticides. According to state officials, the school's headmistress had bought the cooking oil used in the food from a grocery store owned by her husband. On 20 July police said that a forensic report confirmed the cooking oil contained "very toxic" levels of monocrotophos, an agricultural pesticide.

== Reactions ==
Nineteen of the children's bodies were buried on or near school grounds in protest. Across Bihar, numerous students refused to eat their meals in the days following the incident. On 17 July, hundreds of Mashrakh residents took to the streets in protest. Demonstrators lit fires and burned effigies of Bihar Chief Minister Nitish Kumar. The flames damaged four police vehicles. Others threw stones at the police station and chanted slogans denouncing the government. Some villagers demanded that the Midday Meal program be scrapped. Angry protesters carrying sticks and poles blocked roads and rail lines. Desks and chairs from the school were taken and smashed, while the kitchen area was destroyed. In nearby Chhapra, multiple arson attacks were reported, including reports that a crowd set fire to a bus, but no injuries were reported from either city.

Bihar State Education Minister Shahi commented that many people involved in the program were looking for easy money and that "it is just not possible to taste meals in all the 73,000 schools before children eat the food." He also alleged that the contaminated oil had been purchased from a member of a rival political party. Opposition party members accused the ruling Janata Dal (United) party of acting too slowly and called for a general strike.

The Bihar government promised a thorough investigation and offered INR 200,000 (US$3,400) compensation for families of the dead children. Kumar called an emergency meeting and dispatched forensic experts to Mashrakh. The headmistress and her husband fled after the deaths became public knowledge, and the administrative authority suspended her. A First Information Report was filed against the headmistress for criminal negligence, and police began searching for her. A district magistrate told the BBC that her property would be confiscated if she did not surrender to the authorities. She was apprehended by police in Chhapra on 24 July and held on suspicion of murder and criminal conspiracy. In October 2013 the headmistress and her husband were charged with murder and faced the death penalty if convicted.

== Aftermath ==
The Bihar Government has taken steps to prevent the recurrence of such incidents. The government issued a toll-free number for all complaints related to Midday Meal. It also ordered that the raw grain samples would be kept for three months at Godowns from where items for Midday Meal are supplied. A case was filed by Akhilanand Mishra (one of the victims). On 29 August 2016, headmistress Meena Kumari was sentenced to 17 years in prison for her role in the incident.
