= Mashrakh =

Town in Bihar, India

Mashrakh is a Block and town of Saran District in the western part of Bihar, India. It is located on the right bank of Ghoghari river. It is situated at 40 km from Chhapra and 98 km from state capital Patna. There are 17 Panchayats in Mashrakh Block.

Mashrakh is connected by train between Chhapra, Siwan, Mehsi, Gopalganj and Patna by road, which is connected to Chapra, Gopalganj & Siwan. Mashrakh is now urban area as Nagar Panchayat. Mashrakh used to be a well-known business hub in Saran commissionary. The town has a government hospital, private and government banks, veterinary hospital, police station, head post office, railway junction, T.V. transmission center, and a telecommunication technical hub. There are two Inter & Degree colleges in the block - Mashrak College, Mashrak and Bahadurpur College, Bahadurpur, Mashrak Degree College, Mashrakh. Bhojpuri/Hindi is used as a widely spoken language.

== Villages ==
Some of the villages are Benchapra, Mashrak ramghat (Mashrakh West Tola), Mashrakh Takth, Mashrakh Shastri Tola (Mashrakh Yadu More), Pakri, Bahadurpur, Hanshapir Kawalpura, Gopalbadi, Galimapur, Gangauli, Dhanauti, Sonouli, Semari, Godhna, Chainpur, Charihara, Deoriya, Mashrakh West Tola (Nayaka Tola), Rasauli, Ganauli, Durgauly, Jajauli, Dum Duma, Bahrauly, Baluan, Chhapia, Fenahara, Sapahi, Barwaghat, Arna, Chandbarwan Bansohi, Chakiya, Khajuri, Ghoghiya, Nawada, Bahuara Serukahn Pachkhanda, Khairanpur, Chand Kudariya, Bisnupura, Hanumanganj (Mashrakh East), Satar Ghat.

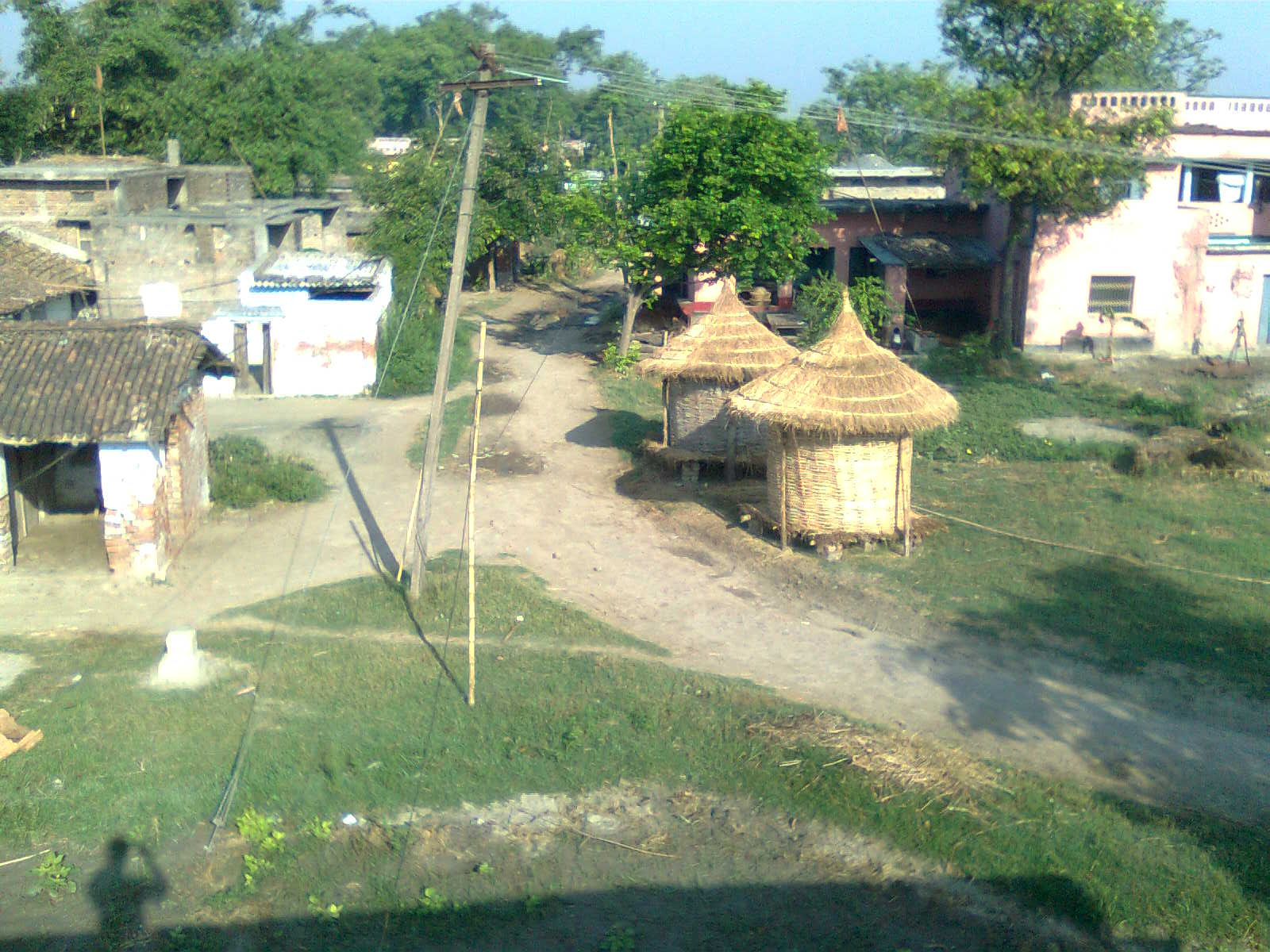
Nawada Village

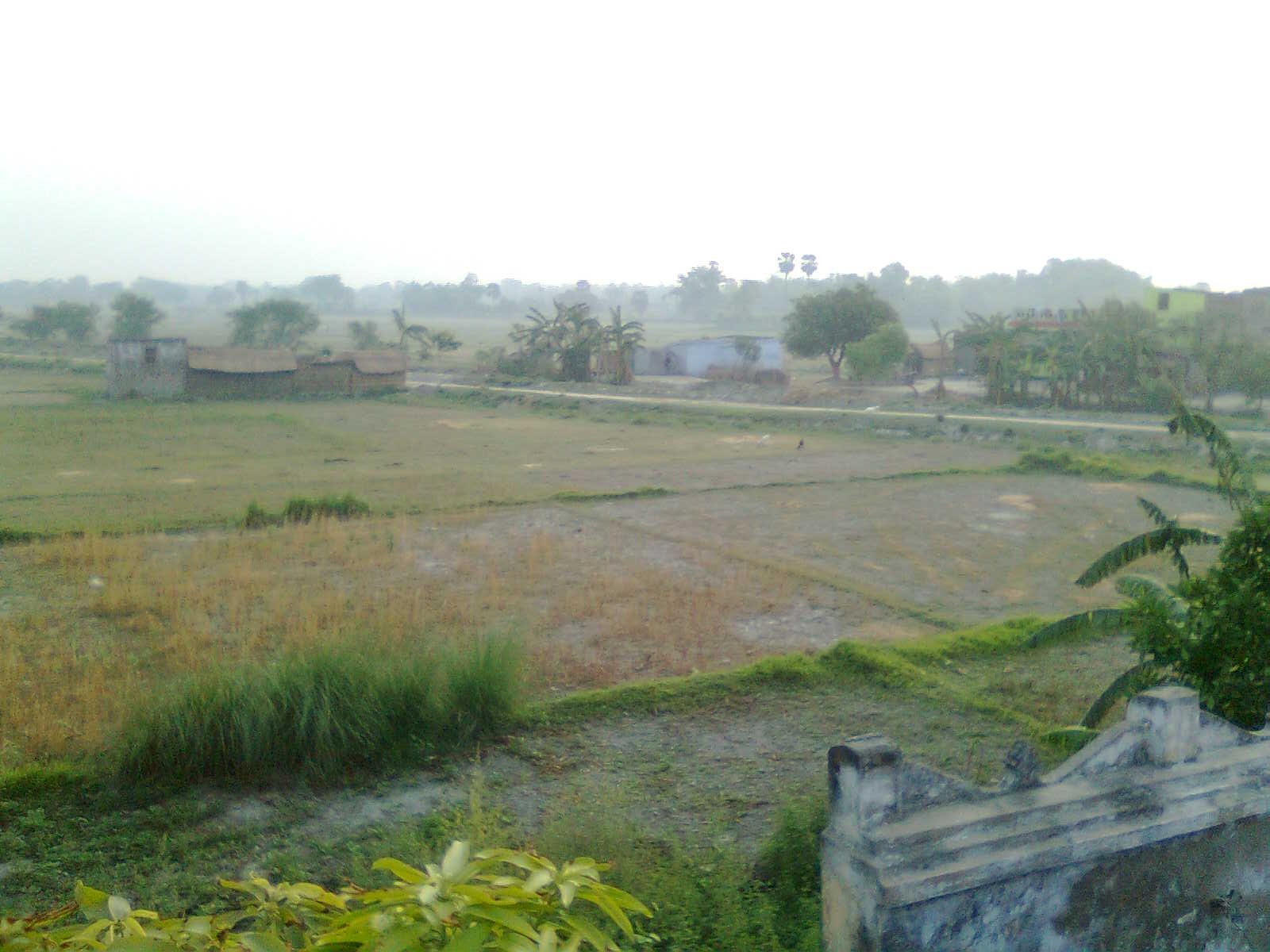
Ghoghiya Village

== Alphabetical list of premier institutions ==
- Aashram School, Mashrakh
- Al Shaheen Paramedical College & Hospital, Mashrakh
- Bahadurpur College, Bahdurpur
- Kendriya Vidyalaya Mashrakh
- Ganauli school, Ganauli
- Gangauli school, Gangauli
- High school, Mashrakh.
- High School, Satjora
- Jagarnath janki girls high school, Mashrakh.
- Janta High School, Godhana
- Krishana Bahadur High School, Harpurajan
- Lokmanya High School, Kudariya Rajapati
- Mashrak Degree College, Mashrakh
- Mahant Ram Swaroop Das High School, Bahuara (Math)
- Middle School Chainpur Charihara
- Mahant Ram Prayag Das High School, Khairanpur (Math)
- Mashrak College, Mashrakh
- Nageshwar High school & Govt. Inter College Bahadurpur
- Primary School Arana, Uttar Tola
- Pragatishil Yuva Kendra (Frmr: Nehru Yuva Mandal), Bahadurpur
- Rajkiya madhya vidyalaya (Board middle school), Mashrakh
- Ram Ekbal Singh college (Degree college) Bahadurpur
- Ramdev Middle school, Mashrakh.
- Rajkiya kanya vidyalaya (Durgaluly)
- Rajkiya Prathamik Vidyalaya (Siyarbhukka)* Tarun Bharat(NGO) Bahadurpur
- Sri Awadh High School, Chainpur Charihara

== Food poisoning ==
On 16 July 2013, in Dharmasati-Mata primary school, at Gandaman village (7.3 km west of Mashrakh), 23 children were poisoned to death after eating free lunch provided by the school, that had been contaminated with insecticide.
