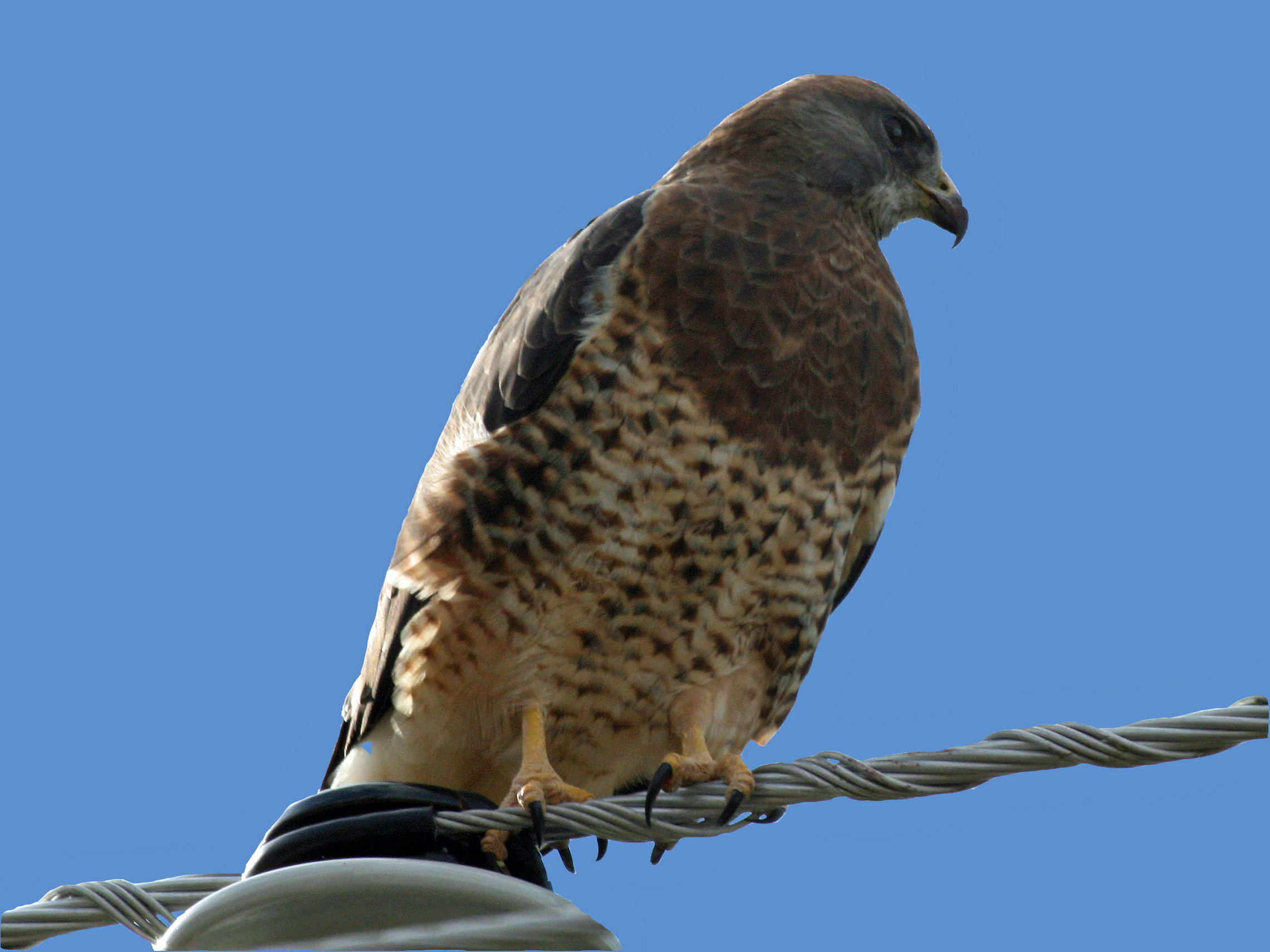
- Male in California, USA

Conservation status
- Least Concern (IUCN 3.1)

Scientific classification
- Kingdom: Animalia
- Phylum: Chordata
- Class: Aves
- Order: Accipitriformes
- Family: Accipitridae
- Genus: Buteo
- Species: B. swainsoni

Binomial name
- Buteo swainsoni Bonaparte, 1838
- Distribution of Swainson's Hawk

Synonyms
- Buteo swainsonii (lapsus)

= Swainson's hawk =

Species of bird

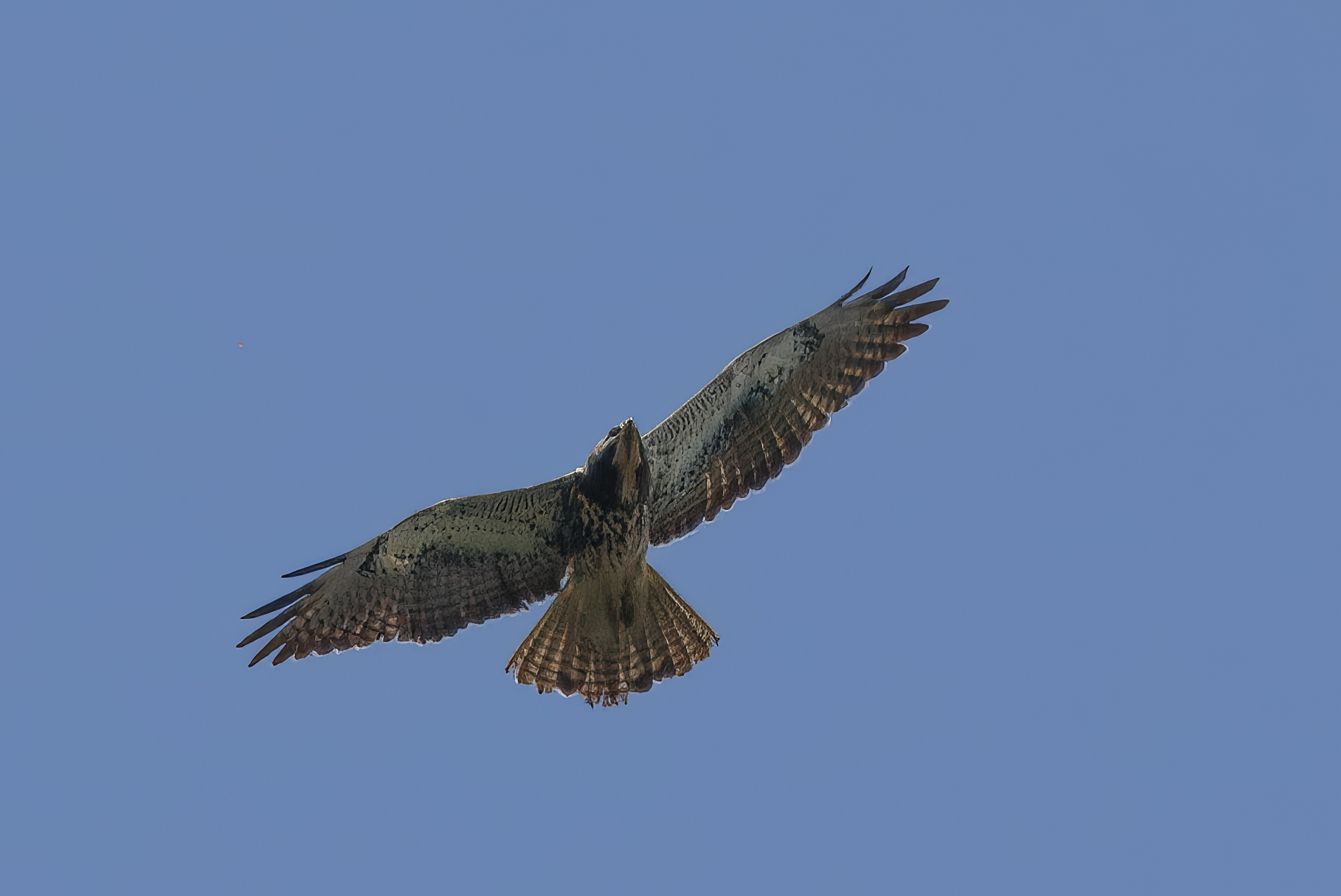
in Ecuador

Swainson's hawk (Buteo swainsoni) is a large bird species in the Accipitriformes order. This species was named after William Swainson, a British naturalist. It is colloquially known as the grasshopper hawk or locust hawk, as it is very fond of Acrididae (locusts and grasshoppers) and will voraciously eat these insects whenever they are available.

Their breeding habitat is prairie and dry grasslands in western North America. They build a stick nest in a tree or shrub or on a cliff edge. This species is a long-distance migrant, wintering in Argentina; it has been recorded as a vagrant in neighboring Chile, in the island countries of the Dominican Republic, and Trinidad and Tobago, and in Norway.

This species or its immediate predecessor is the ancestor of the Galápagos hawk, as demonstrated by recent research. Then later diverged from the mainland birds perhaps 300,000 years ago, a very short time in evolution.

== Description ==
Swainson's hawk is a raptor and a medium-sized member of the genus Buteo. It broadly overlaps in size with the red-tailed hawk (B. jamaicensis), a related species found as a breeding resident almost throughout North America. Swainson's hawk is on average a little shorter in length, 43–56 cm (17–22 in) long, and weighs a bit less, 0.5–1.7 kg (1.1–3.7 lb). However, Swainson's hawk has a slightly longer wingspan at 117–137 cm (46–54 in), with more slender, elongated wings, than the red-tailed hawk. Female Swainson's hawks, at an average weight of 1.15 kg (2.5 lb), are somewhat larger and heavier than males, at an average of 0.81 kg (1.8 lb). Among standard measurements, the wing chord is 36.2–42.7 cm (14.3–16.8 in), the tail is 18.5–23.4 cm (7.3–9.2 in), the tarsus is 6.2–8 cm (2.4–3.1 in) and the bill (from the gape) is 3–3.5 cm (1.2–1.4 in). In flight, Swainson's hawk holds its wings in a slight dihedral; it tips back and forth slightly while soaring.

There are two main color variations. Over 90% of individuals are light-morph; the dark morph is most common in the far west of the range:

- Light-morph adults are white on the underparts with a dark, reddish "bib" on the chest and a noticeable white throat and face patch. The underwings, seen as the bird soars, have light linings (leading edge) and dark flight feathers (trailing edge), a pattern unique among North American raptors. The tail is gray-brown with about six narrow dark bands and one wider subterminal band. The upperparts are brown. Juveniles are similar but dark areas have pale mottling and light areas, especially the flanks, have dark mottling. The chest is pale with some darker marks. The subterminal band of the tail is less obvious. Birds in their first spring may have pale heads because of feather wear.
- Dark-morph birds are dark brown except for a light patch under the tail. There is a rufous variant that is lighter on the underparts with reddish bars. The tails of both these forms resemble those of the light morph.

== Range and migration ==
Swainson's hawk inhabits North America mainly in the spring and summer, and winters in South America. Breeding areas include south-central Alberta, central Saskatchewan, southwestern Manitoba, and west and southern Minnesota. They will breed as far north as east-central Alaska, and southwestern Yukon. Breeding continues south through the eastern parts of Washington and Oregon, locally to the central valley of California, Arizona, New Mexico, Colorado, and most of Texas. The eastern part of its range includes Minnesota, northwestern Iowa, most of Nebraska, Kansas, and Oklahoma, and all but eastern Texas. It periodically occurs in Iowa and rarely in northwestern Missouri, northern Illinois, and southwestern Wisconsin. Young birds may occasionally appear well east of their range during spring and fall migrations.

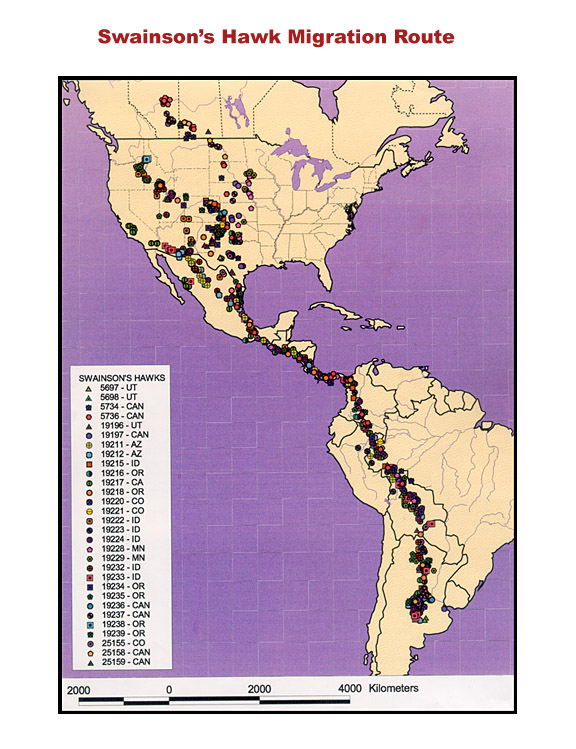
Swainson's hawk migration route. 30 birds were fitted with satellite tracking devices to produce this map. Incomplete: the birds also pass through Ecuador.

Small populations winter in southeastern Florida and along the Texas coast, probably having failed to find the way south around the Gulf of Mexico. Individuals reported north of these areas in winter (for example, on Christmas Bird Counts) are almost invariably misidentified buteos of other species. Swainson's hawks mostly winter on the pampas of South America in Argentina, Uruguay, and southern Brazil. The populations of Swainson's hawks breeding in California's Central Valley also winter in western Mexico and central America.

Swainson's hawk is the second longest migrant of any North American raptor, after arctic nesting Peregrine falcons. The flight from breeding ground to South American pampas in southern Brazil or Argentina can be as long as 7,100 mi (11,400 km). Each migration can last at least two months.

They leave the breeding grounds from August to October. Fall migration begins each clear day on which a wind blows in the general direction of travel. Birds gain altitude by soaring in circles on a rising thermal and then set their wings and close their tails as they glide, slowly losing altitude until they find another thermal and rise with it. Thus, waves and small groups are strung out across the sky.

The birds gradually head southwards toward Central America where virtually the entire population funnels through the Isthmus of Panama. Concentrations over locations like Ancon Hill, Balboa, and Panama City are spectacular. In the Andes, it migrates along a narrow corridor and rarely strays off course; for example, it was only recorded in the Serranía de las Quinchas of Colombia – just 100 km (62 mi) or so off its usual migration route – in 2000/2001.

In Brazil, migrating birds pass through the western states of Acre and Mato Grosso, while wintering birds may stray to the southern states of Paraná, Rio Grande do Sul and São Paulo. But surprisingly, the occasional Swainson's hawk — including birds one or two years of age — has also been recorded in the eastern states of Maranhão, Pará, Pernambuco, Piauí and Tocantins, thousands of kilometers away from their usual migration route and wintering grounds and sometimes in mid-summer. This suggests that individuals occasionally become lost during migration, and/or that they may spend a whole year in the tropical regions and range about, rather than just overwintering at one site.

In Uruguay, the first dedicated studies show it to be not uncommon but patchily distributed across the country in winter. Notably, it had been underreported in Flores and Paysandú Departments, where it seems in fact to be a regular visitor. In recent years, the first birds were seen in early November, and some stayed until late February. Numbers increase throughout November and peak in December, when flocks of many dozen roam the open lands. But many stay only for a scant few weeks before leaving again.

Spring migration broadens once the birds have passed through Mexico as they disperse through the breeding range. Migrant groups are noted in the southern U.S. states in March. The earliest Swainson's hawks arrive in southern Canada in late March, with migration peaking from mid April onwards.

== Ecology ==
The habitat of Swainson's hawk consists of open and semi-open country – deserts, grasslands and prairies – in both its breeding and wintering ranges. It favors wild prairie, hayfields, and pastures over wheat fields and alfalfa fields, which may offer its prey too much cover. It requires elevated perches for hunting and a supply of small mammals such as young ground squirrels as prey for its nestlings. The breeding distribution of Swainson's hawk is tied very closely to the distribution of various small mammals for this reason. In Saskatchewan, for example, the distribution of Richardson's ground squirrel and Swainson's hawk are precisely the same.

Swainson's hawk will defend its breeding territory from other buteos. Breeding densities may vary from one area to the next but averages one pair per 2.5 sq mi (6.5 km^{2}). The average home range estimate for this hawk is 1 to 2 sq mi (2.6 to 5.2 km^{2}). It gathers in groups for feeding and migrating. However, in each case, such gathering is not social, but motivated by good feeding or migrating conditions.

Swainson's hawk, the red-tailed hawk (B. jamaicensis) and the ferruginous hawk (B. regalis) compete for territory, and defend territories against each other. In many parts of the plains these three species nest in the same general area and exploit much the same prey base. Although diets overlap greatly, habitats may not overlap as much. In Oregon, Swainson's hawk selects nesting trees having a different configuration than those used by red-tailed or ferruginous hawks. In southern Alberta, different nesting habitats help reduce food competition, with Swainson's hawk favoring areas with scattered trees or riparian borders, while red-tailed hawks nest in stands of tall trees, and ferruginous hawks nest on the open plains.

Reduced reproductive success may result from Swainson's hawk's nesting proximity to these two other buteos. Swainson's hawk is generally tolerant of people. The bird is attracted to haying, mowing, and plowing operations. House sparrows, European starlings, and other small birds may nest in or near a Swainson's hawk's nest.

In winter quarters, they are far more tolerant, though many birds will still fend for themselves. In Uruguay, the species likes largely open but broken (with rocks or woods) plains or low hills, where it can be seen to gather in larger groups. Groups of a few dozen birds are not uncommon. Flocks of over one hundred birds have been recorded several times, e.g. one that roamed the Cuchilla Marincho region south of Andresito (Flores Department) in mid-late December 2005.

=== Natal dispersal ===
Swainson's hawks have a high natal fidelity, and individuals generally return to areas where they fledged. On average, female natal dispersal (mean distance of 11.1 kilometers) was higher than males (mean distance of 8.3 kilometers) in northern California. Longer natal dispersal distance in females is typical for many bird species, and may aid in inbreeding avoidance. Natal dispersal in the Canadian prairies was significantly higher at 66.7 kilometers, with documented movements as far as 310 kilometers.

Males that fledged in territories with higher primary productivity had lower natal dispersal in northern California, suggesting they were trying to stay closer to more prey-dense habitat.

=== Hunting and food ===
Swainson's hawks hunt using various methods. Many still-hunt, watching for prey activity from a perch such as a tree, bush, pylon, telephone pole, hummock or other high object. Others hunt by soaring over open ground with wings held in a dihedral, using their stellar vision to watch for prey activity below. It occasionally courses low over the ground like a northern harrier (Circus cyaneus) or hovers like a rough-legged hawk (B. lagopus) while hunting. They frequently engage in transect-glides while actively hunting in flight. It commonly perches on the ground both during migration and on the breeding grounds. While hunting on the ground, almost entirely for large insects, their gait can appear awkward but they are often successful in pinning down several insects per day. During migration, it typically roosts for the night on bare ground with scattered trees, a habit that distinguishes it from fellow long-distance migrants such as the broad-winged hawk (B. platypterus), which roosts in closed-canopy woodlands.

These birds patrol open areas or scan for prey from a perch; they may also catch insects in flight. They take advantage of insects turned up by farm equipment or driven out by fire. A hunting Swainson's hawk will use several strategies. It hunts insects such as dragonflies or dobsonflies while in flight, flapping little as it rides a wind current and stoops upon a fly, grabbing it with its foot and immediately transferring the prey to its bill. It uses a similar strategy to grab individual free-tailed bats from flying streams of bats. Also, when dragonfly hordes are grounded by weather, Swainson's hawk will stand near groups sheltering from the wind and pluck at individual insects. Swainson's hawk closely follows both tractors and wild fires for injured or fleeing food. It will also run down insect prey on the ground. Occasionally a hawk will stand still on a dirt bank or elevated mound waiting for prey to appear. It commonly hunts from elevated perches such as telephone poles, stooping on prey when it is sighted.

Swainson's hawks may be largely insectivorous except when nesting. Insect prey commonly taken includes grasshoppers, crickets, and locusts. Other Buteo hawks in this species range, including smaller-bodied species, do not normally prefer insects in their diet but instead focus on rodents and other small vertebrates. However, breeding birds switch mainly to capturing vertebrate prey, which pairs then bring to their nestlings. Breeding Swainson's hawks rely heavily upon small mammals such as young ground squirrels, young cottontails, pocket gophers, mice, young jackrabbits, and, at least locally, small birds and other vertebrates including reptiles and amphibians. Birds taken include large birds such as Mallards, and Sage Grouse which may have been injured initially.

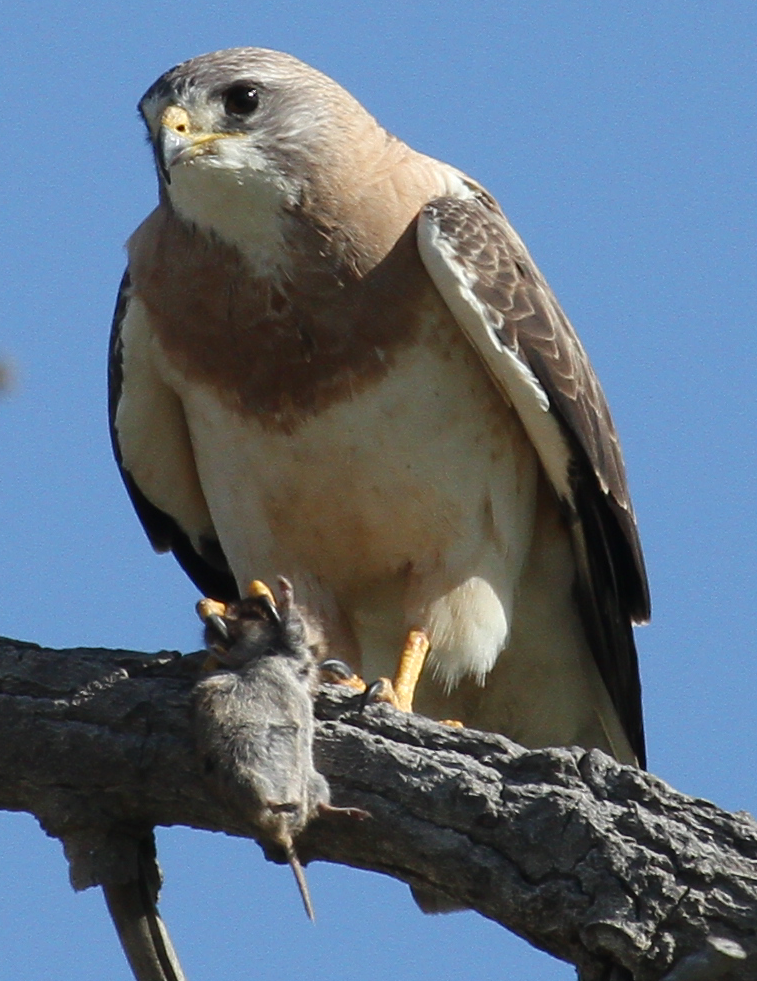
Swainson's Hawk and prey, Weld County, Colorado

Other unusual bird species taken include American kestrel, and young short-eared owls. More typical in size are young lark buntings taken at their fledging time. Reptiles, which can comprise large parts of a diet, include snakes such as racers, gopher snakes and striped whipsnakes, and lizards. Amphibians may include tiger salamanders and toads. Swainson's hawk is an opportunistic feeder which responds quickly to local concentrations of food.

In Argentina, flocks of immature Swainson's hawks feed on flocks of the migratory darner dragonfly Rhionaeschna bonariensis, following the hordes of insects and feeding mostly on the wing. Local outbreaks of locusts may also be exploited for food by one or more age-classes of birds. The immatures wintering in southern Florida apparently feed upon either insects, mice, or both, when turned up from field plowing. They move from one freshly ploughed field to the next.

There is also some evidence that road-killed birds and animals are also consumed both on the wintering grounds and on the breeding grounds. The species commonly follows tractors and other agricultural equipment during haying or ploughing, where rodents are exposed for the hawks to capture, or insects are uncovered after crop cutting. Wildfires often attract foraging Swainson's hawks, especially grass fires in their South American wintering range. In South American grass fires, the hawks frequently wait around the edges of the fire, picking off not only insects but also vertebrates including nothuras, lizards and snakes.

=== Reproduction ===
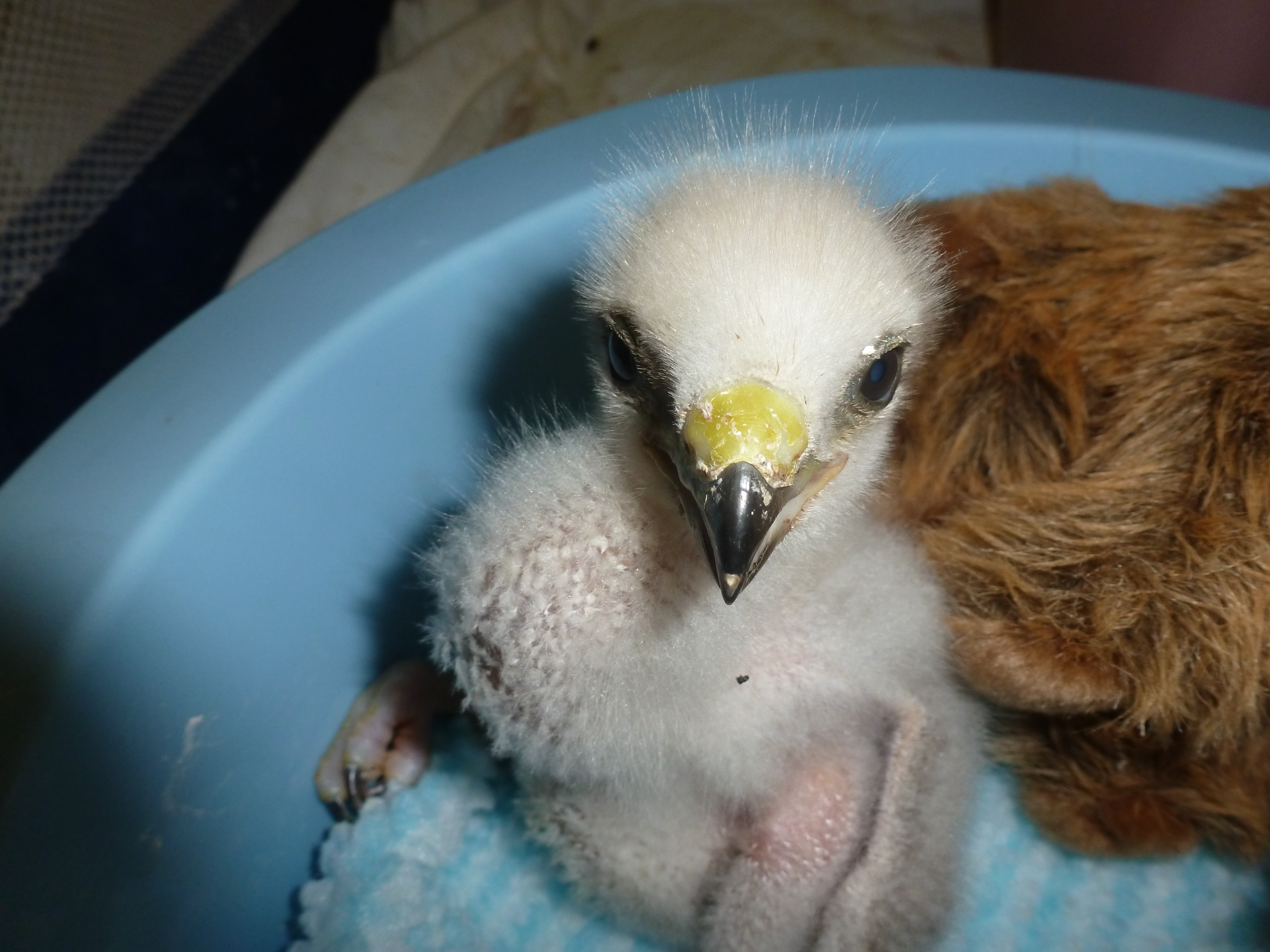
A Swainson's hawk chick

When Swainson's hawks arrive at their nesting sites in March or April, they may return to their original nests as these hawks are noted to be monogamous. Research indicates that they have a high degree of mate and territorial fidelity. This is unusual in a long-distance migrant. Seven to fifteen days after the birds arrive, the males begin constructing nests on the ground, ledges or in a trees. The nest consists of twigs and grasses and can take up to two weeks to complete. New nests may be constructed, old nests refurbished, or abandoned nests of other species — namely corvids (e.g. common raven, black-billed magpie, and American crow) — are refurbished.

The courtship displays of Swainson's hawk are not well known. One activity involves circling and diving above a potential nest site. The underwings and rump are flashed and the birds call. The display may end with one bird diving to land on the edge of the nest. Copulation occurs mainly in the morning and evening on the dead limbs of trees. The female may assume the receptive position without a prior display. During treading one of the birds calls.

Swainson's hawks typically nest in isolated trees or bushes, shelterbelts, riparian groves, or around abandoned homesteads. Occasionally, a pair will nest on the ground or on a bank or ledge. Nest trees and bushes include ponderosa pine, Douglas-fir, spruce, cottonwood, domestic poplar, aspen, elm, mesquite, willow, saguaro cactus, and soaptree yuccas. Nests are located from 9 to 15 ft (2.7 to 4.6 m) above the ground, often in the shaded canopy but near the top of the tree. Nests are flimsy structures, usually smaller than the nests of the red-tailed hawk, and often blow down after nesting season.

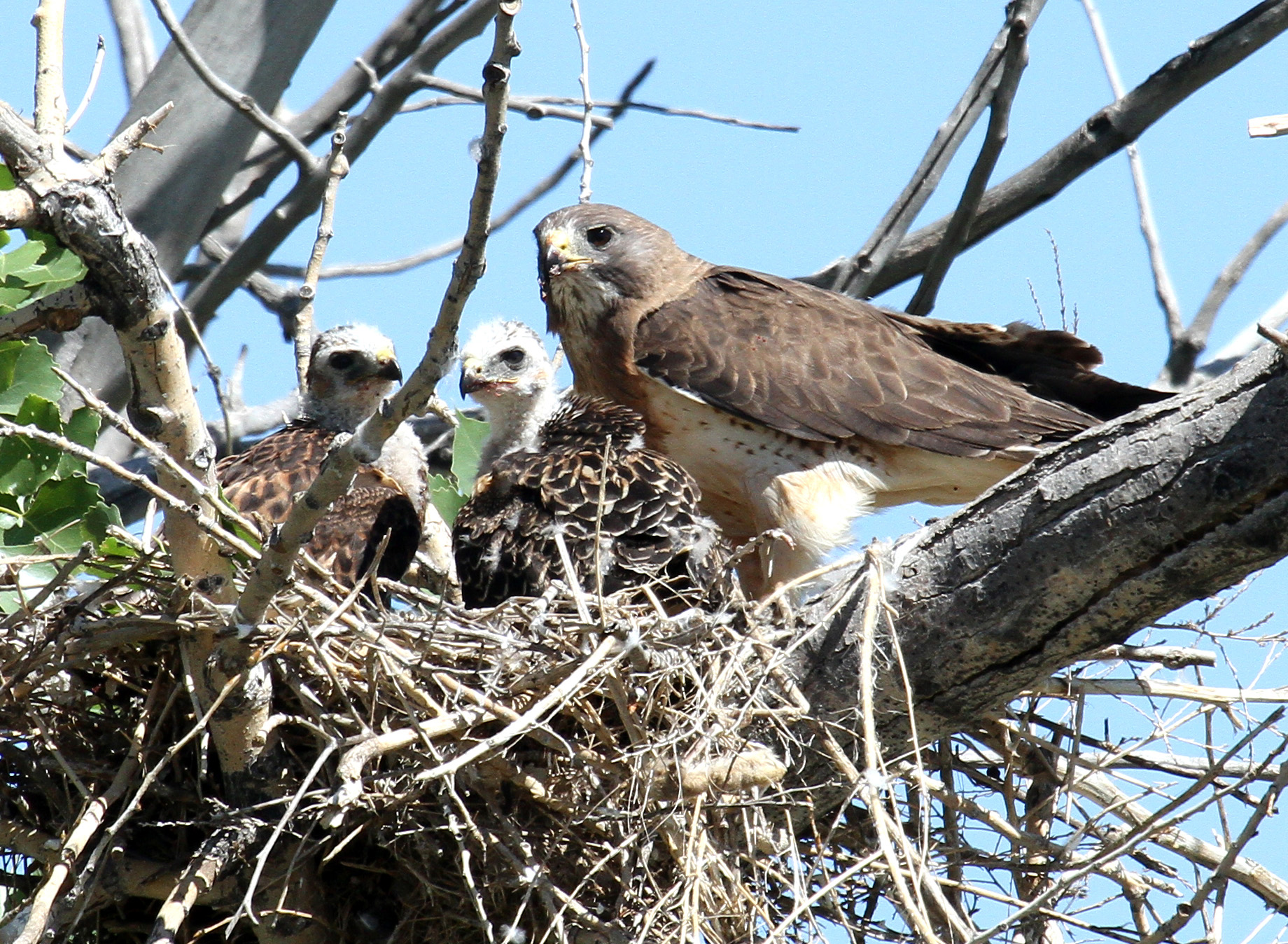
Swainson's Hawk and nestlings, Weld County, Colorado

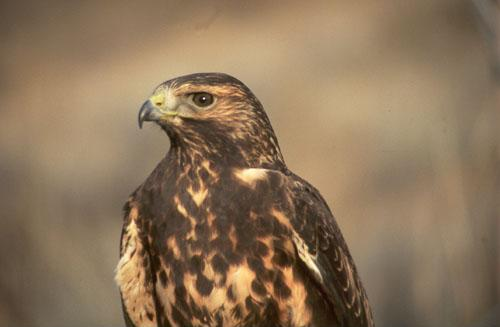
Juvenile Swainson's hawk

Clutch size ranges from one to four eggs, but averages two to three. Each egg is elliptical in shape, about 2.25 in (57 mm) long and 1.8 in (46 mm) wide. The egg is smooth with fine granulations and the ground color is white, often tinted bluish or greenish. During incubation the shell color quickly wears to dull white. Some eggs are plain; others are lightly marked with spots and blotches of light brown. The incubation period is 34 to 35 days, with the female incubating while the male brings food.

Young Swainson's hawks are fed small, young mammals. Flight feathers begin to emerge on the young at 9 to 11 days. High nestling mortality often occurs when the young are 15 to 30 days old and may be a result of fratricide. The young begin to leave the nest for surrounding branches at 33 to 37 days, fledging occurs at about 38 to 46 days. The fledglings are dependent upon their parents for 4 to 5 weeks. This species has one brood a year and apparently does not lay replacement clutches.

=== Lifespan ===
The oldest wild Swainson's hawk on record is 26 years 1 month (Swainson's Hawk 26 years 01 months 07/06/1986 California Local Unknown 07/24/2012 California Saw or photographed neck collar, color band, or other marker (not federal band) while bird was free Alive - Released/Left On Bird). There are a number of cases of Swainson's hawks living over 20 years old. In the Canadian prairies, researchers found one 17 year old Swainson's hawk still alive and breeding. In northern California, several individuals banded as nestlings reached at least 20 years old in this population, though the age distribution suggests that these individuals are rare in a breeding population. In contrast to these relatively old individuals, most individuals that survived to breeding age in northern California died at 9.2 ± 5.5 years old, and there were not differences in longevity between males and females.

Swainson's hawks die because of collisions with traffic, illegal shooting, electrocution, and even during severe prairie weather such as hailstorms. Wind storms and hail caused 30% nest failure in one study. When sharing a grove with nesting great horned owls, the hawks suffer much egg loss due to owl predation. The species also suffers from frequent, unexplained egg infertility.

=== Status and conservation ===
Swainson's hawk has suffered population declines since the first half of the twentieth century and was Blue-listed in the United States from 1972 to 1982. It has since been placed on the National Audubon's List of Special Concern in 1986. It is now listed by the United States Fish and Wildlife Service as a Category 3C candidate. Swainson's hawk was removed from the active federal list because it was found to be more abundant than previously thought; it is not considered a threatened species by the IUCN. It remains listed as a threatened species by the California Department of Fish and Game as it has been since 1983.

In California, Swainson's hawk has been an important species for conservation planning in the Central Valley. The largest populations are found in Yolo, Solano, Sacramento, and San Joaquin counties. These hawks rely heavily on riparian woodlands for nesting and on nearby Grasslands and Alfalfa fields for foraging. Studies in the Natomas Basin found that hawks traveled up to 10 km from nests, with home ranges averaging 87–172 km². They showed strong positive associations with grasslands and alfalfa. However, Orchards and vineyards were used far less frequently.

A major cause of Swainson's hawk population decline was pesticide use in its wintering grounds of Argentina. DDT usage was banned in the U.S. in 1972, however companies continued to manufacture it and export it to countries such as Argentina. Farmers there were using pesticides (DDT and monocrotophos) to control grasshopper and locust infestations, and Swainson's hawks were ingesting these pesticides in several different ways, but mainly by gorging themselves on the insects as they lay dying. The U.S. has worked with Argentine farmers to resolve this problem.

Swainson's hawk has adapted well to grazing and pastureland and seems to be holding its own over much of its breeding range, from northern Mexico to the southern parts of the prairie provinces. However, far western populations, like that of Oregon, and southern California, have drastically declined, often due to habitat loss or incompatible agricultural practices. A possible reason for declines in parts of its range may be agriculturally motivated reductions in populations of both ground squirrels and grasshoppers, major seasonal foods.

Although often nesting close to human activity, some Swainson's hawks are very easily disturbed at the nest and often desert, especially early in the season. The bird is often quite tame and an easy target for shooters traveling isolated prairie roads. The species may also be affected in ways yet to be understood by some insecticides and herbicides, including those used on its wintering grounds. Based on the Regional Habitat Conservation Plans, including those for the Natomas Basin, Yuba–Sutter region, and Yolo County, the species has been monitored annually. Between 2001 and 2013, surveys in the Natomas Basin reported 43–65 nesting territories each year, although with stable or slightly increasing trends. Reproductive success averaged about one fledgling per pair per year, suggesting that conservation measures have helped maintain local populations in California.
