= Acridine orange =

Organic dye used in biochemistry

- Acridine orange

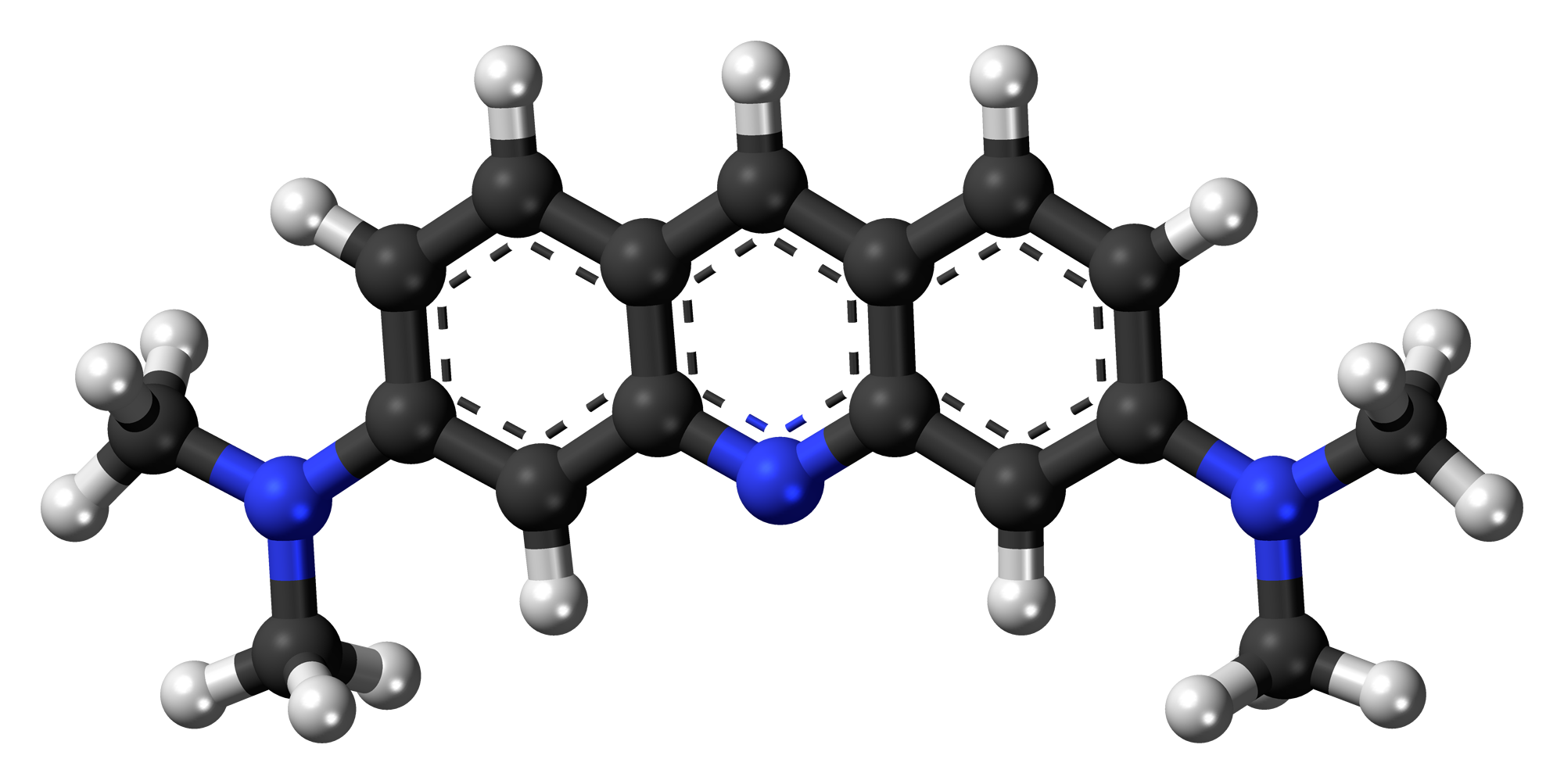

Names
- Preferred IUPAC name N,N,N′,N′-Tetramethylacridine-3,6-diamine
- Systematic IUPAC name 3-N,3-N,6-N,6-N-Tetramethylacridine-3,6-diamine
- Other names 3,6-Acridinediamine Acridine Orange Base; Acridine Orange NO; Basic Orange 14; Euchrysine; Rhoduline Orange; Rhoduline Orange N Rhoduline Orange NO; Solvent Orange 15 Waxoline Orange A

Identifiers
CAS Number	494-38-2
3D model (JSmol)	Interactive image
ChEBI	CHEBI:87346; hydrochloride: CHEBI:51739; cation: CHEBI:52788
ChEMBL	ChEMBL81880
ChemSpider	56136
ECHA InfoCard	100.122.153
EC Number	200-614-0
KEGG	C19315
MeSH	Acridine+orange
PubChem CID	62344
RTECS number	AR7601000
UNII	F30N4O6XVV
CompTox Dashboard (EPA)	DTXSID60197783
- InChI: InChI=1S/C17H19N3/c1-19(2)14-7-5-12-9-13-6-8-15(20(3)4)11-17(13)18-16(12)10-14/h5-11H,1-4H3 Key: DPKHZNPWBDQZCN-UHFFFAOYSA-N; InChI=1/C17H19N3/c1-19(2)14-7-5-12-9-13-6-8-15(20(3)4)11-17(13)18-16(12)10-14/h5-11H,1-4H3 Key: DPKHZNPWBDQZCN-UHFFFAOYAJ
- SMILES: n1c3c(cc2c1cc(N(C)C)cc2)ccc(c3)N(C)C

Properties
Chemical formula	C_{17}H_{19}N_{3}
Molar mass	265.360 g·mol^{−1}
Appearance	Orange powder

Hazards
- GHS labelling
Pictograms	(GHS06: Toxic) (GHS07: Exclamation mark)
Signal word	Warning
Hazard statements	H302, H312, H341
Precautionary statements	P281, P304+P340
NFPA 704 (fire diamond)	2 0 0
- Except where otherwise noted, data are given for materials in their standard state (at 25 °C [77 °F], 100 kPa). verify (what is ?) Infobox references

Acridine orange is an organic compound that serves as a nucleic acid-selective fluorescent dye with cationic properties useful for cell cycle determination. Acridine orange is cell-permeable, which allows it to interact with DNA by intercalation, or RNA via electrostatic attractions. When bound to DNA, acridine orange is very similar spectrally to an organic compound known as fluorescein sodium.

Acridine orange is used in epifluorescence microscopy and flow cytometry. The ability to penetrate the cell membranes of acidic organelles and cationic properties of acridine orange allows it to differentiate between various types of cells (i.e., bacterial cells and white blood cells).

Acridine orange and fluorescein have a maximum excitation at 502nm and 525 nm (green). When acridine orange associates with RNA, the fluorescent dye experiences a maximum excitation shift from 525 nm (green) to 460 nm (blue). The shift in maximum excitation also produces a maximum emission of 650 nm (red). Acridine orange is able to withstand low pH environments, allowing the fluorescent dye to penetrate acidic organelles such as lysosomes and phagolysosomes that are membrane-bound organelles essential for acid hydrolysis or for producing products of phagocytosis of apoptotic cells. The shift in maximum excitation and emission wavelengths provides a foundation to predict the wavelength at which the cells will stain.

== Optical properties ==
When the pH of the environment is 3.5, acridine orange becomes excited by blue light (460 nm). When acridine orange is excited by blue light, the fluorescent dye can differentially stain human cells green and prokaryotic cells orange (600 nm), allowing for rapid detection with a fluorescent microscope. The differential staining capability of acridine orange provides quick scanning of specimen smears at lower magnifications of 400x compared to Gram stains that operate at 1000x magnification. The differentiation of cells is aided by a dark background that allows colored organisms to be easily detected. The sharp contrast provides a mechanism for counting the number of organisms present in a sample. When acridine orange binds to DNA, the dye exhibits a maximum excitation at 502 nm producing a maximum emission of 525 nm. When bound to RNA, acridine orange displays a maximum emission value of 650 nm and a maximum excitation value of 460 nm. The maximum excitation and emission value that occur when acridine orange is bound to RNA are the result of electrostatic interactions and the intercalation between the acridine molecule and nucleic acid-base pairs present within RNA and DNA.

== Preparation ==
Acridine dyes are prepared via the condensation of 1,3-diaminobenzene with suitable benzaldehydes. Acridine orange is derived from dimethylaminobenzaldehyde and N,N-dimethyl-1,3-diaminobenzene. It may also be prepared by the Eschweiler–Clarke reaction of 3,6-Acridinediamine.

== History ==
Acridine orange is derived from the organic molecule acridine, which was first discovered by Carl Grabe and Heinrich Caro, who isolated acridine by boiling coal in Germany during the late nineteenth century. Acridine has antimicrobial factors useful in drug-resistant bacteria and isolating bacteria in various environments. Acridine orange in the mid-twentieth century was used to examine the microbial content found in soil and direct counts of aquatic bacteria. Additionally, the method of acridine orange direct count (AODC) proved useful in the enumeration of bacteria found within landfills. Direct epifluorescent filter technique (DEFT) using acridine orange is a method known for examining the microbial content within food and water. The use of acridine orange in clinical applications has become widely accepted, mainly focusing on highlighting bacteria in blood cultures. Past and present studies comparing acridine orange staining with blind subcultures for the detection of positive blood cultures showed that the acridine orange is a simple, inexpensive, rapid staining procedure that appears to be more sensitive than the Gram stain for detecting microorganisms in cerebrospinal fluid and other clinical and non-clinical materials.

== Applications ==
Acridine orange has been widely accepted and used in many different areas, such as epifluorescence microscopy, and the assessment of sperm chromatin quality. Acridine orange is useful in the rapid screening of ordinarily sterile specimens. When acridine orange is used with flow cytometry, the differential stain is used to measure DNA denaturation and the cellular content of DNA versus RNA in individual cells, or detect DNA damage in infertile sperm cells. Acridine orange is recommended for the use of fluorescent microscopic detection of microorganisms in smears prepared from clinical and non-clinical materials. Acridine orange staining has to be performed at an acidic pH to obtain the differential staining, which allows bacterial cells to stain orange and tissue components to stain yellow or green.

Acridine orange is recorded as being used as a curing agent to cure selectable marker in antibiotic resistant organisms present in a sample. When isolates are subjected to curing in the presence of acridine orange, a substantial number were recorded to have been cured of at least one resistant marker. Acridine orange is also used to stain acidic vacuoles (lysosomes, endosomes, and autophagosomes), RNA, and DNA in living cells. This method is a cheap and easy way to study lysosomal vacuolation, autophagy, and apoptosis. The emission color of acridine orange changes from yellow, to orange, to red as the pH drops in an acidic vacuole of the living cell. Under specific conditions of ionic strength and concentration, acridine orange emits red fluorescence when it binds to RNA by stacking interactions, and green fluorescence when it binds to DNA by intercalation. Depending on acridine orange concentration, nuclei may emit yellowish-green fluorescence in untreated cells, and green fluorescence when RNA synthesis is inhibited by compounds such as chloroquine. Acridine orange can be used in conjunction with ethidium bromide or propidium iodide to differentiate between viable, apoptotic, and necrotic cells. Additionally, acridine orange may be used on blood samples causing bacterial DNA to fluoresce, aiding in the clinical diagnosis of bacterial infections, such as meningitis.
