= DFFA =

Protein found in humans

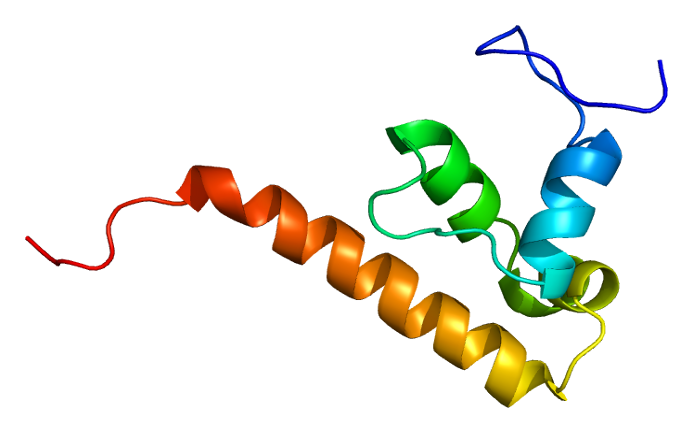

Identifiers
- Aliases: DFFA, DFF-45, DFF1, ICAD, DNA fragmentation factor subunit alpha
- External IDs: OMIM: 601882; MGI: 1196227; GeneCards: DFFA
Available structures
PDB	Ortholog search: PDBe RCSB
PDB	List of PDB id codes 1IBX, 1IYR, 1KOY

Gene location (Human)
Chr.	Chromosome 1 (human)
Band	1p36.22	Start	10,456,522 bp
Band	1p36.22	End	10,472,529 bp

Gene location (Mouse)
Chr.	Chromosome 4 (mouse)
Band	4|4 E2	Start	149,188,603 bp
Band	4|4 E2	End	149,205,104 bp
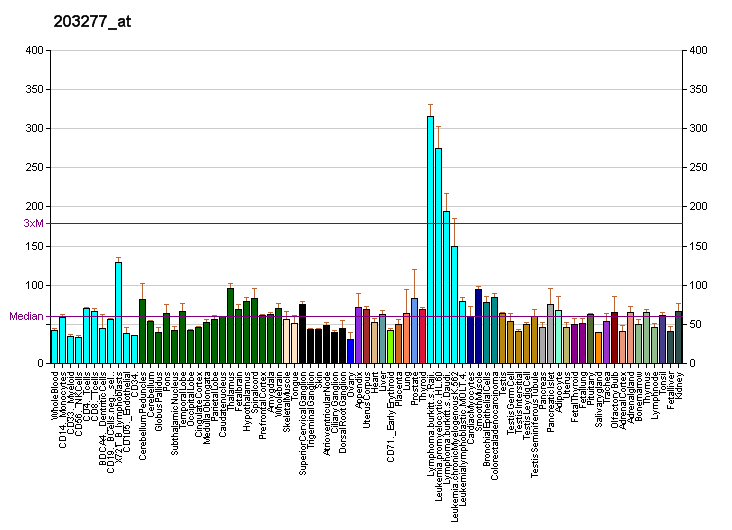
RNA expression pattern
Bgee	Human / Mouse (ortholog); Top expressed in: internal globus pallidus; inferior ganglion of vagus nerve; nipple; cardia; ventral tegmental area; cartilage tissue; stromal cell of endometrium; renal medulla; subthalamic nucleus; islet of Langerhans / Top expressed in: soleus muscle; yolk sac; medulla oblongata; lip; pons; quadriceps femoris muscle; zone of skin; muscle of thigh; primary motor cortex; tibialis anterior muscle; More reference expression data
BioGPS	More reference expression data
Gene ontology
Molecular function	protein binding; protein domain specific binding; protein folding chaperone activity; deoxyribonuclease inhibitor activity
Cellular component	cytosol; lipid droplet; intracellular anatomical structure; nucleus; nucleoplasm; cytoplasm; plasma membrane
Biological process	positive regulation of apoptotic process; negative regulation of execution phase of apoptosis; negative regulation of apoptotic DNA fragmentation; apoptotic DNA fragmentation; thymocyte apoptotic process; apoptotic process; negative regulation of deoxyribonuclease activity; chaperone-mediated protein folding
Sources:Amigo / QuickGO
Orthologs
Databases	NCBI: entry; OMA: entry
Species	Human	Mouse
Entrez	1676	13347
Ensembl	ENSG00000160049	ENSMUSG00000028974
UniProt	O00273	O54786
RefSeq (mRNA)	NM_213566; NM_004401	NM_001025296; NM_010044
RefSeq (protein)	NP_004392; NP_998731; NP_998731.1	NP_001020467; NP_034174
Location (UCSC)	Chr 1: 10.46 – 10.47 Mb	Chr 4: 149.19 – 149.21 Mb
PubMed search
- Wikidata
View/Edit Human	View/Edit Mouse

DNA Fragmentation factor 45kDa, C terminal domain
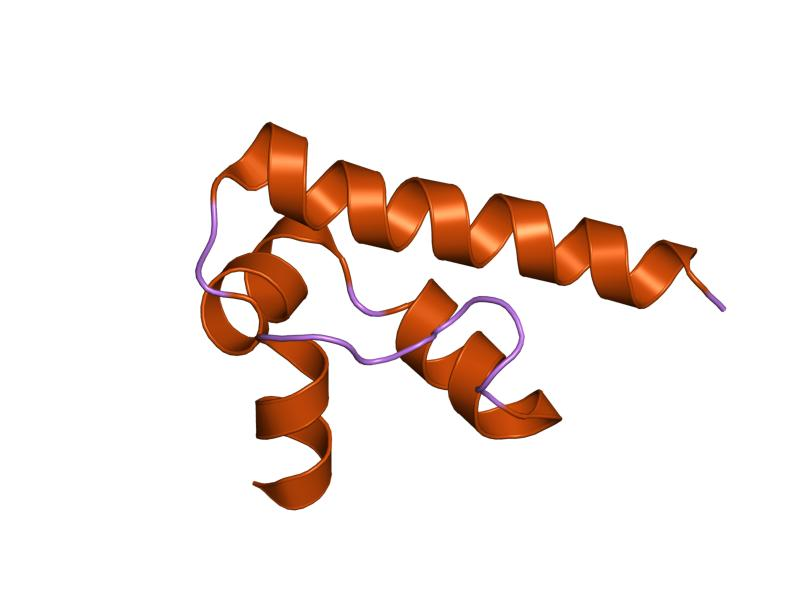
- nmr structure of dff-c domain

Identifiers
- Symbol: DFF-C
- Pfam: PF09033
- InterPro: IPR015121
Available protein structures:
- PDB: IPR015121 PF09033 (ECOD; PDBsum)
- AlphaFold: IPR015121; PF09033

DNA fragmentation factor subunit alpha (DFFA), also known as Inhibitor of caspase-activated DNase (ICAD), is a protein that in humans is encoded by the DFFA gene.

Apoptosis is a cell death process that removes toxic and/or useless cells during mammalian development. The apoptotic process is accompanied by shrinkage and fragmentation of the cells and nuclei and degradation of the chromosomal DNA into nucleosomal units. DNA fragmentation factor (DFF) is a heterodimeric protein of 40-kD (DFFB) and 45-kD (DFFA) subunits. DFFA is the substrate for caspase-3 and triggers DNA fragmentation during apoptosis. DFF becomes activated when DFFA is cleaved by caspase-3. The cleaved fragments of DFFA dissociate from DFFB, the active component of DFF. DFFB has been found to trigger both DNA fragmentation and chromatin condensation during apoptosis. Two alternatively spliced transcript variants encoding distinct isoforms have been found for this gene.

The C-terminal domain of DFFA (DFF-C) consists of four alpha-helices, which are folded in a helix-packing arrangement, with alpha-2 and alpha-3 packing against a long C-terminal helix (alpha-4). The main function of this domain is the inhibition of DFFB by binding to its C-terminal catalytic domain through ionic interactions, thereby inhibiting the fragmentation of DNA in the apoptotic process. In addition to blocking the DNase activity of DFFB, the C-terminal region of DFFA is also important for the DFFB-specific folding chaperone activity, as demonstrated by the ability of DFFA to refold DFFB.

== Interactions ==
DFFA has been shown to interact with DFFB.
