= TUNEL assay =

Molecular biology method used to detect DNA fragmentation

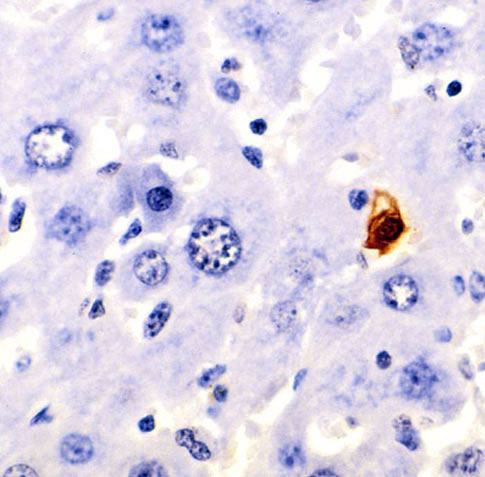
Mouse liver showing an apoptotic cell stained with TUNEL

Terminal deoxynucleotidyl transferase dUTP nick end labeling (TUNEL) is a method for detecting DNA fragmentation by labeling the 3′- hydroxyl termini in the double-strand DNA breaks generated during apoptosis.

== Method ==
TUNEL is a method for detecting apoptotic DNA fragmentation, widely used to identify and quantify apoptotic cells, or to detect excessive DNA breakage in individual cells. The assay relies on the use of terminal deoxynucleotidyl transferase (TdT), an enzyme that catalyzes attachment of deoxynucleotides, tagged with a fluorochrome or another marker, to 3'-hydroxyl termini of DNA double strand breaks. It may also label cells having DNA damage by other means than in the course of apoptosis.

== History ==
The fluorochrome-based TUNEL assay applicable for flow cytometry, combining the detection of DNA strand breaks with respect to the cell cycle-phase position, was originally developed by Gorczyca et al. Concurrently, the avidin-peroxidase labeling assay applicable for light absorption microscope was described by Gavrieli et al. Since 1992 the TUNEL has become one of the main methods for detecting apoptotic programmed cell death. However, for years there has been a debate about its accuracy, due to problems in the original assay which caused necrotic cells to be inappropriately labeled as apoptotic. The method has subsequently been improved dramatically and if performed correctly should only identify cells in the last phase of apoptosis. New methods incorporate the dUTPs modified by fluorophores or haptens, including biotin or bromine, which can be detected directly in the case of a fluorescently-modified nucleotide (i.e., fluorescein-dUTP), or indirectly with streptavidin or antibodies, if biotin-dUTP or BrdUTP are used, respectively. The most sensitive of them is the method utilizing incorporation of BrdUTP by TdT followed by immunocytochemical detection of BrdU.
