= Caspase-activated DNase =

Protein found in humans

DFFB
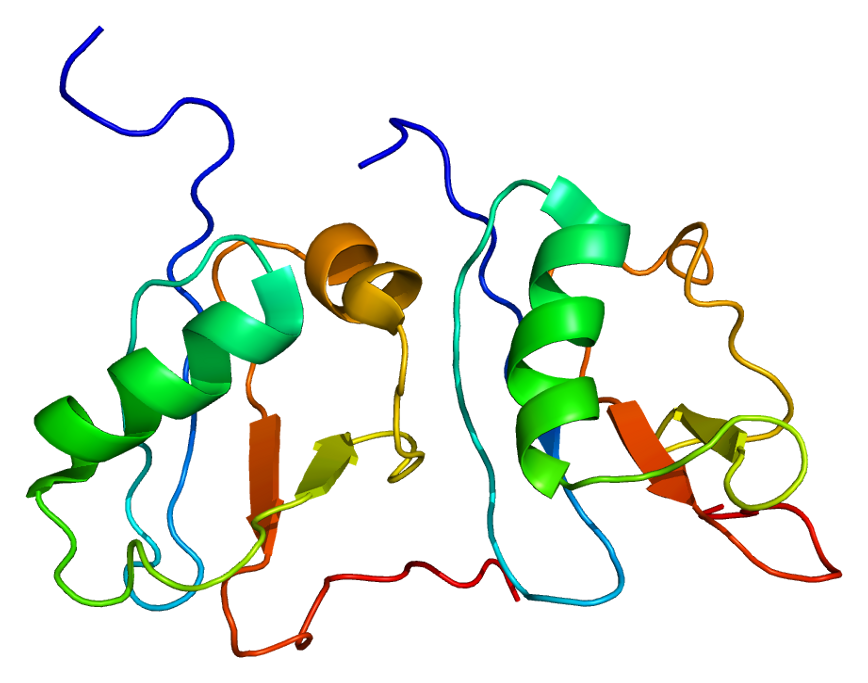

Identifiers
- Aliases: DFFB, DNA fragmentation factor, 40kDa, beta polypeptide (caspase-activated DNase), CAD, CPAN, DFF-40, DFF2, DFF40, DNA fragmentation factor subunit beta
- External IDs: OMIM: 601883; MGI: 1196287; GeneCards: DFFB
Available structures
PDB	Ortholog search: PDBe RCSB
PDB	List of PDB id codes 1IBX

Gene location (Human)
Chr.	Chromosome 1 (human)
Band	1p36.32	Start	3,857,267 bp
Band	1p36.32	End	3,885,429 bp

Gene location (Mouse)
Chr.	Chromosome 4 (mouse)
Band	4|4 E2	Start	154,048,906 bp
Band	4|4 E2	End	154,059,583 bp
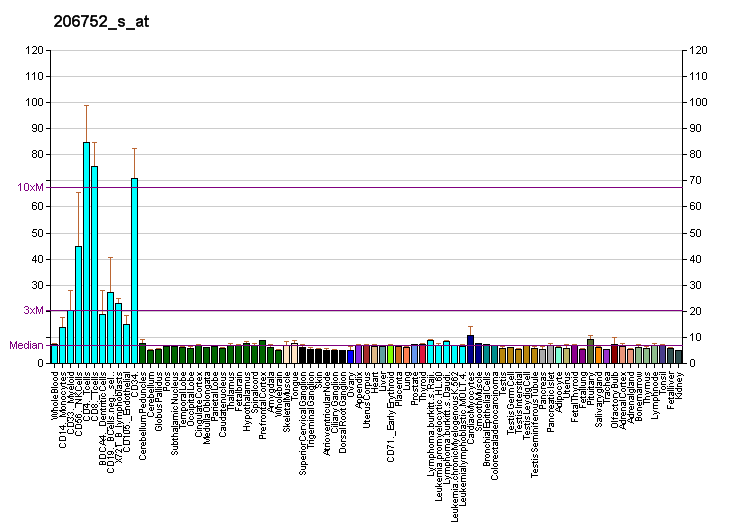
RNA expression pattern
Bgee	Human / Mouse (ortholog); Top expressed in: cerebellar hemisphere; right hemisphere of cerebellum; granulocyte; endothelial cell; Achilles tendon; anterior pituitary; right ovary; mucosa of transverse colon; left ovary; body of pancreas / Top expressed in: granulocyte; morula; lumbar subsegment of spinal cord; embryo; thymus; superior frontal gyrus; cerebellar cortex; embryo; jejunum; Paneth cell; More reference expression data
BioGPS	More reference expression data
Gene ontology
Molecular function	enzyme binding; nuclease activity; hydrolase activity; protein binding; deoxyribonuclease activity; protein domain specific binding; identical protein binding; disordered domain specific binding
Cellular component	cytoplasm; cytosol; nucleolus; intracellular anatomical structure; nucleus; nucleoplasm
Biological process	apoptotic DNA fragmentation; apoptotic chromosome condensation; apoptotic process; DNA catabolic process; protein homooligomerization
Sources:Amigo / QuickGO
Orthologs
Databases	NCBI: entry; OMA: entry
Species	Human	Mouse
Entrez	1677	13368
Ensembl	ENSG00000169598	ENSMUSG00000029027
UniProt	O76075	O54788
RefSeq (mRNA)	NM_001004285; NM_001004286; NM_001282669; NM_004402; NM_001320132 NM_001320136	NM_007859
RefSeq (protein)	NP_001269598; NP_001307061; NP_001307065; NP_004393	NP_031885
Location (UCSC)	Chr 1: 3.86 – 3.89 Mb	Chr 4: 154.05 – 154.06 Mb
PubMed search
- Wikidata
View/Edit Human	View/Edit Mouse

DNA fragmentation factor 40 kDa
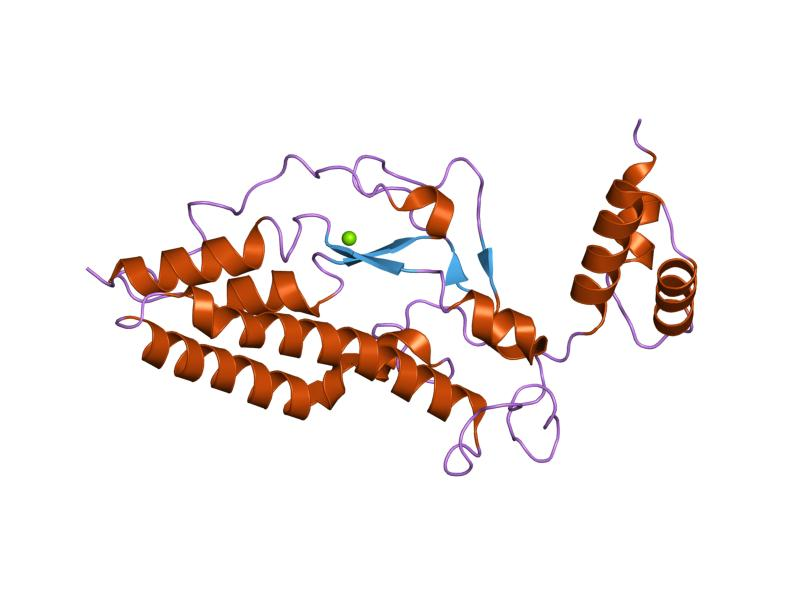
- Crystal structure of caspase-activated DNAse (CAD)

Identifiers
- Symbol: DFF40
- Pfam: PF09230
- InterPro: IPR015311
- SCOP2: 1v0d / SCOPe / SUPFAM
Available protein structures:
- PDB: IPR015311 PF09230 (ECOD; PDBsum)
- AlphaFold: IPR015311; PF09230

Caspase-activated DNase (CAD) or DNA fragmentation factor subunit beta is a protein that in humans is encoded by the DFFB gene. It breaks up the DNA during apoptosis and promotes cell differentiation. It is usually an inactive monomer inhibited by ICAD. This is cleaved before dimerization.

== Function ==
Apoptosis is a cell self-destruct process that removes toxic and/or useless cells during mammalian development and other life processes. The apoptotic process is accompanied by the shrinkage and fragmentation of cells and nuclei, as well as the degradation of the chromosomal DNA into nucleosomal units. DNA fragmentation factor (DFF) is a heterodimeric protein composed of 40-kD (DFFB) and 45-kD (DFFA) subunits. DFFA is the substrate for caspase-3 and triggers DNA fragmentation during apoptosis. DFF becomes activated when DFFA is cleaved by caspase-3. The cleaved fragments of DFFA dissociate from DFFB, the active component of DFF. DFFB has been found to trigger both DNA fragmentation and chromatin condensation during apoptosis. Multiple alternatively spliced transcript variants encoding distinct isoforms have been identified for this gene; however, the biological validity of some variants has not been determined.

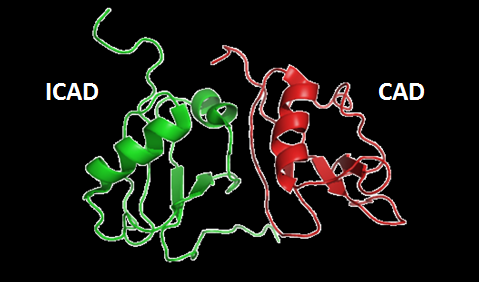
CAD and ICAD forms

Despite this gene being present in every cell, the protein it encodes is only expressed in various tissues and cell types, including the pancreas, heart, colon, leukocytes, prostate, ovary, placenta, kidney, spleen and thymus.

It is also known as caspase activated nuclease (CPAN), dna fragmentation factor 40 (DFF-40), DFF2 and DFFB. Additionally, other nomenclatures have resulted from combining these previous ones.

== Structure ==
This heterodimer is an endonuclease with a high content of cysteine residues. It remains inactive in growing cells when associated with its inhibitor (ICAD, DNA fragmentation factor 45 kDa subunit, DFFA or DFF45), resulting in a complex ICAD-CAD. Their dissociation allows DFF40 to oligomerize to form a large functional complex, which is, by itself, an active DNase.

=== DFF40 subunit or CAD ===
It weighs 40 kDa. Moreover, it contains three domains making up a CAD monomer: C1 or N-terminal CAD; C2, which consists of three separate α chains; and lastly, C3, which is the largest and functionally the most important. What is more, combining C3’s amino acids leads to 5 α helices, 4 β lamina and a loop at the catalytic C-terminal which interacts with each other. Therefore, a cavity (active site) where DNA can fit is produced, even though there is another binding region responsible for a stable DNA complex during its fragmentation.

=== DFF45 subunit or ICAD ===
DFFA is encoded by an alternatively encrypted mRNAs originating two distinct forms: short (ICAD-S) and long (ICAD-L), which act like a specific chaperone ensuring the correct CAD's folding Besides, it contains two aspartic acid residues (Asp117 and Asp224) where CAD is identified and, consequently, it stays bounded until Caspase-3 splits this union.

== Activation process ==
As usual in non-apoptotic growing cells, caspase activated dnase is held in check and inactivated in the cytoplasm thanks to its association with the inhibitor, inhibitor of caspase-activated DNase (ICAD) also known as DNA fragmentation factor 45 kDa (DFF45).

ICAD is encoded by alternatively spliced mRNAs, which generate long (ICAD-L) and short (ICAD-S) forms of ICAD. Therefore, ICAD has a dual function; it acts as a CAD inhibitor and also as a chaperone for CAD synthesis, assisting in the correct assembly of the protein.

ICAD has two caspase recognition sites at Asp117 and Asp224. CAD release from ICAD inhibition is achieved by cleavage of ICAD at these Asp residues by caspase-3.

Caspase-3 is activated in the apoptotic cell. Caspase-3 activation is a cell requirement during the early stages of skeletal myoblast differentiation. Its catalytic site involves the sulfohydryl group of Cys-285 and the imidazole ring of His-237. The caspase-3 His-237 stabilizes the target Aspartate, causing the break of the association of ICAD and CAD, leaving the endonuclease CAD active, allowing it to degrade chromosomal DNA.

Once the inhibitor is released, and for the CAD monomers to function properly, they must come together to form a functional dimer with vertical symmetry.

== Interactions ==
DFFB has been shown to interact with DFFA.

== Cell differentiation ==
Caspase 3 is responsible for cellular differentiation, although it is unclear how this kind of protein can promote cell apoptosis. Caspase signals resulting from the activation of nuclease CAD indicate that the cell differentiation is due to a CAD modification in chromatin structure.

CAD leads to the initiation of DNA strand breakage, which occurs during terminal differentiation of some cells, such as skeletal muscle cells. The targeting of the p21 promoter is responsible for inducing cell differentiation, which is promoted by modifying the nuclear DNA microenvironment.

Cell diversity originates from cell differentiation, which is attributed to the activation of specific transcription factors. It also depends on the activity of a protein or a common signal. The factor that seems to induce more cell differentiation is caspase-3 protease. This was identified as the penultimate stage of the apoptosis pathway.

Some studies have shown that this differentiation is due to the presence of many CAD kinase substrates. Referring to the example of skeletal cells, their differentiation is associated with the cleavage of the kinase MST1.

Moreover, it has been observed that CAD participates in the formation of the genome, whose DNA breaks occur during the early stages of cell differentiation. Besides, Caspase 3 induces DNA breaks in the promoter of the p21 factor, and this strand breakup is related to p21 gene expression.

== Cell apoptotic death ==
The protein caspase DNase is an endonuclease involved in the cell apoptotic process that facilitates the DNA breakup. Cell apoptotic death is a process executed by cysteine proteases that allows animals to maintain their homeostasis, also regulated by other mechanisms such as growth and cell differentiation. This biological response is characterized by the chromosomal DNA’s degradation into tiny fragments within the nucleus of the cell. After many investigations and research, it was possible to ensure that Caspase-activated DNase is mainly responsible for this destruction due to a long list of stimuli.

One of the experiments conducted by the investigators to validate the theory involved introducing a mutated form of the protein into both TF-1 human cells and Jurkat cells, which had previously responded to the usual (non-mutated) form of the endonuclease and had died of apoptosis. As a result, these cells died, taking into account this genetic modification, but they did not show DNA breakup. This was the key evidence to prove that the CAD form is implicated in this part of the process, because without its contribution, the fragmentation would not have occurred.

Later, it was found that the way this protein induces the DNA breakup is explained by its forms CAD and ICAD, which facilitate both the entry and exit from the nucleus of the cell.
