= Marc Goldstein =

American urologist

Marc Goldstein is an American urologist who is the Matthew P. Hardy Distinguished Professor of Reproductive Medicine, and Urology at Weill Cornell Medical College; Surgeon-in-Chief, Male Reproductive Medicine and Surgery; and Director of the Center of Male Reproductive Medicine and Microsurgery at New York Presbyterian Hospital. He is Adjunct Senior Scientist with the Population Council's Center for Biomedical Research, located on the campus of Rockefeller University.

He serves on the editorial boards of Journal of Andrology and Microsurgery.

== Education and training ==
Goldstein graduated from the College of Medicine, State University of New York - Downstate Medical Center in Brooklyn, NY in 1972. He worked as a resident in general surgery at Columbia Presbyterian Hospital in New York. After three years overseas in the United States Air Force, attaining the rank of Major and flying an F4 Phantom aircraft as a Flight Surgeon, Goldstein was trained in urology at Downstate Medical Center from 1977 to 1980. He continued his post-graduate training in reproductive physiology as an AUA scholar at the Population Council, Center for Biomedical Research, located on the campus of Rockefeller University, and at the Rockefeller University Hospital.

== Career and research ==
Goldstein is a specialist in male infertility and scrotal disorders and is renowned for his pioneering work on microsurgical management of male infertility such as vasectomy reversals, varicocelectomy, Hydrocele, Inguinal hernia repair and testis-sparing testicular tumor excision. He was the first American surgeon to be trained in, and perform, the Chinese method of no-scalpel vasectomy. Dr. Goldstein's research has shown that there is a direct link between varicocele and low testosterone and varicocele and loss of fertility in men. His research has also shown that the presence of varicoceles can run in families.

Goldstein's current research focuses on the relationship between high sperm DNA fragmentation and varicocele, mapping sperm DNA fragmentation in the male genital tract to determine the best surgically retrieved sperm specimen to use for IVF/ICSI and the association between DNA fragmentation and semen parameters.

Goldstein is also the co-principal investigator in the Shang Ring project in Africa, providing minimally invasive circumcision techniques to remote areas in an attempt to stem the transmission of sexually transmitted infections, such as HIV. The project has received support and grants from both the NIH and the Bill and Melinda Gates Foundation.

== Publications ==
Goldstein has authored or co-authored 339 journal articles and book chapters, including in Gray's Anatomy, Glenn's Urologic Surgery and Campbell's Urology. He is the author of Surgery of Male Infertility, the first textbook on the subject. He co-edited the updated edition Surgical and Medical Management of Male Infertility with Peter Schlegel, the Chairman of the Department of Urology at Weill Cornell Medical College, New York Presbyterian Hospital. Goldstein is also the co-author of The Vasectomy Book, A Baby at Last! and Reproductive Medicine Secrets.

== Awards ==
Goldstein is the recipient of the Star Award from American Society of Reproductive Medicine in 2011, 2012, 2013, 2014, 2016, 2017, and 2018. He won the John Coleman, MD Teaching Award from the Department of Urology at Weill Cornell Medical College and the Howard and Georgeanna Jones Lifetime Achievement Award from the American Fertility Association. In 2017 he won the Kavoussi Family Outstanding Teacher Award from the American Society of Reproductive Medicine and in 2018 he won the Distinguished Reproductive Urology Award from the Society for the Study of Male Reproduction. In 2008, he received an Honorary Doctor of Science from SUNY Downstate Medical Center.

Goldstein has been listed in New York Magazine's "America's Top Doctors", beginning in 1990 and continuing presently. He was also listed in Castle-Connolly Medical's "America's Top Doctors" and Marquis Who's Who "Who's Who in America".

== Patents ==
Goldstein has been at the forefront of male infertility surgical innovation. He holds patents for the Goldstein Microspike Surgical Approximator, the Percutaneous vasectomy method, Method and apparatus for support of tubularization of surgical grafts, microsurgical suture needle, medium for preserving tissue without tissue culturing occurring, the vasectomy procedure and related kit and the multi-needle holding device.

== Appearances in the media ==
On December 9, 2014, Goldstein appeared on HuffPost Live to discuss male factor infertility. On October 6, 2014, Goldstein was quoted in AMNewYork regarded "Man-Spreading". Goldstein has also appeared on The Katie Couric Show, has been interviewed by New York 1 and The New York Times.
