= Antisperm antibodies =

Antibodies produced against sperm antigens

Antisperm antibodies (ASA) are antibodies produced against sperm antigens.

== Types ==
Antisperm antibodies are immunoglobulins of IgG, IgA, and/or IgM, which are directed against sperm antigens. ASA can be detected in ejaculate, cervical mucus, follicular fluid, and blood serum of both males and females. While IgG and IgA might be present in blood serum and/or genital tract fluids, IgM is only present in blood serum. IgG occurring in genital tract fluids is either produced locally or transuded from blood serum, whereas IgA (secretory type) is always produced locally.

== Causes ==
Traditionally, the breakdown of the blood-testis barrier had been established as the cause of ASA production. This mechanism had been advocated in testicular trauma and surgery, orchitis (mumps), varicocele, bacterial infections (epididymitis, prostatitis), testicular cancer, and unprotected anal intercourse. However, the association between aforementioned conditions and ASA production is controversial. Only chronic obstruction, most typically represented by vasectomy followed by vasectomy reversal, is the only one condition leading constantly to high and permanent ASA titers. Apart from breaching of blood-testis barrier, epididymal distension, raised intraluminal pressure, and sperm granuloma formation leading spermatozoal phagocytosis seem to be contributing factors.

As of 2017, it is unclear how or why women generally do not develop ASA, and why some women do develop them; the clearest correlations are that women whose male partners have ASA in their semen are more likely to have ASA, and women with ASA tend to react only to their partner's sperm and not to other men's sperm. The hypotheses for how women form ASA, as of 2017, includes cross-reactivity with microbial antigens, antibodies raised against ASA in their partner's semen, and a cytokine-driven immune response to ASA in their partner's semen. In women, spermatozoa in the genital tract after intercourse are not a factor in the production of antisperm antibodies. But this is possible with a trauma to the vaginal mucosa during the intercourse or the deposition of sperm in the gastrointestinal tract by oral or anal intercourse.

== Influence on reproductive processes ==
In both men and women, ASA production are directed against surface antigens on sperm, which can interfere with sperm motility and transport through the female reproductive tract, inhibiting capacitation and acrosome reaction, impaired fertilization, influence on the implantation process, and impaired growth and development of the embryo.

== Diagnosis ==
Different tests have been developed to identify ASA in various biological substrates. However, only Mixed Antiglobulin Reaction (MAR) test and Immunobead Test (IBT) are currently being recommended by the WHO for the assessment of human sperm antibodies.

MAR test in its original version is based on the classical Coombs test; sperm is mixed with human red blood cells coated with human IgG. A rabbit or goat monospecific anti-human IgG antibody is added. Agglutination (slow “shaky” movements) can be observed if sperm are coated with ASA. Instead of human red blood cells, commercial version of MAR test uses latex particles coated with human IgG ASA. Since the test is performed with fresh semen and the incubation requires only 10 minutes, it renders MAR test a quick and simple screening tool for ASA in human ejaculate. However, samples with very low sperm count (i.e. severe oligoastheno-, or even azoospermia) cannot be evaluated using this method. Also presence of debris or high viscosity of semen can preclude its use.

IBT is based on polyacrylamide spheres coated with rabbit anti-human immunoglobulins antibody. These particles are used either to identify ASA bound to sperm (direct IBT), or ASA present in various biological fluids – seminal plasma, cervical mucus, uterine, oviduct or follicular fluid (indirect IBT); the latter one requires addition of donor ASA-free sperm.

ASA might be present also in the cervical mucus of the female. These antibodies might be proved by the postcoital test (PCT). Although the test has been declared obsolete by some authors, it has still been widely used by many gynecologists. The test is performed 8–12 hours after an unprotected sexual intercourse at the estimated time of ovulation, when the cervical mucus is least viscous and thus most permeable for the sperm. The result is considered poor in case of less than 10 sperm per high power field are apparent.

Generally, the main drawback of all tests used for the diagnosis of ASA is a heterogeneity of data presented in available studies, caused by lack of method standardisation, various semen preparations, and inconsistent cut-off values. These facts compromise precise comparison between various methods.

== Treatment ==
Since the precise etiology of ASA production is mostly unknown, causative treatment of ASA-mediated infertility is rarely possible.

Immunosuppressive therapy comprising corticosteroids or ciclosporin has been proposed by several authors with promising results, nevertheless large randomized controlled trials failed to show a clear benefit. Owing to sometimes severe adverse effects, many clinicians are reluctant to treat immune infertile patients with above mentioned drugs.

In the clinical practice, assisted reproductive techniques are being considered as a golden standard for the immune-mediated infertility.

Albeit intrauterine insemination (IUI) might circumvent ASA present in the cervical mucus, in a study comprising 119 IUI, no live pregnancy was reported, suggesting involvement of other mechanisms of ASA. Since ASA are usually bound to sperm surface antigens with high affinity, ordinary wash-up used before ICSI is not effective. Thus, some authors recommend treatment of sperm with chymotrypsin/galactose to cleave ASA molecules. However, this method has not been adopted by clinicians as some concerns exist regarding a possible negative impact of this digestive enzyme on sperm surface receptors involved in fertilization.

In vitro fertilization (IVF) reaches lower pregnancy rates in ASA-positive individuals – basically, the higher ASA titers, the more negative outcome. This inverse association is more pronounced in ASA-positive males. It has been reported ASA binding to the sperm head have more negative impact on fertilization than those binding to the sperm midpiece or tail.

If intracytoplasmic sperm injection (ICSI) is added to IVF, similar outcome has been observed in both ASA-positive and ASA-negative couples. Nevertheless, one study showed significantly higher spontaneous pregnancy loss in the ASA-positives.

== Prevalence ==
ASA can arise whenever sperm encounter the immune system. ASA occur in women and men, including women or men who receive anal sex from men or who perform oral sex on men.

ASA have been considered as infertility cause in around 10–30% of infertile couples, and in males, about 12–13% (20,4% in meta-analysis) of all diagnosed infertility is related to an immunological reason. The incidence can well be higher as the contribution to idiopathic infertility (31% of all cases) still remains elusive. However, these antibodies are also present in approximately 1–2.5 % of fertile men and in 4% of fertile women; the presence of ASA in the fertile population suggests that not all ASA cause infertility. Only those antibodies directed against antigens involved in the fertilization process impair fertility.

While around 75% of vasectomized men who have the process reversed by vasovasostomy have high levels of ASA in their blood, these circulating antibodies do not affect fertility in men; only ASA in the male reproductive tract appears to do so.

About 40-45% of sex workers test positive for antisperm antibodies, compared to just 5% in the control group. Research has shown that these numbers increase for those who do not use contraceptive methods.

== Research ==
There is a general effort to identify concrete sperm surface antigens which serve as a target for ASA. As sperm undergoes biological changes including capacitation, acrosome reaction, zona binding, and sperm-egg fusion, the set of sperm surface antigens is highly dynamic in time. Additionally, some of the sperm surface antigens might be incorporated into the plasma membrane of the embryo resulting in postfertilization negative impact of ASA.

Research has been conducted, but not clinically tested, to use sperm antigens or recombinant ASAs as contraceptive vaccines for humans, as well as captive and wild animals.

The mechanisms through which both women and men develop ASA is also poorly understood and a subject of research.
