= Capuchin Annual =

Irish annual publication

- Former editors: Father Senan OFM Cap, Father Henry OFM Cap
- Categories: Literature, social issues, popular culture, poetry, religion
- Frequency: Yearly
- First issue: 1930
- Final issue: 1977
- Country: Ireland
- Based in: Dublin
- Language: English, Irish

The Capuchin Annual was an Irish annual publication published every year in Dublin by the Capuchins from 1930 to 1977. The motto of the publication was Do chum Glóire Dé agus Onóra na hÉireann (For the Glory of God and the Honour of Ireland). Many articles were from an Irish nationalist perspective.

== History ==
The Annual was started by Fr Senan OFM Cap, who continued as editor for many years. It contained articles (mainly in English but also in Irish) on a variety of subjects, poetry, cartoons, illustrations and photographs. It was printed by John English of Wexford.

The cover, featuring a Capuchin friar and a dog (a young wolf), was designed by Seán O'Sullivan. The chief artist for many years was Richard King. The cartoonist from 1942 to 1955 was Charles E. Kelly.

== Contributors ==
Among the many contributors over the years were:

- Robert Barton on agriculture, 1935
- Francis Browne contributed fifty photographs, in 1942
- Stephen Brown on Medieval Literature, in 1942
- Arthur C Clarke 1971
- Sigerson Clifford 1940
- Martin Coen 1971
- J. C. Coleman on Irish caves, in 1949
- Seán Cronin on Kevin Barry in 1970
- Alice Curtayne on "The Art of the Microphone" 1936
- Aodh De Blácam 1935
- Eddie Doherty
- Frank Duff 1956-57
- Gabriel Fallon on the Abbey, 1937
- Desmond Fennell 1964
- Aloys Fleischmann on Carl Gilbert Hardebeck, 1943
- Frank Gallagher 1931
- Carl Hardebeck 1943
- Benedict Kiely on Donegal, in 1944
- Thomas MacGreevy, in 1942, 1949, 1950–51, 1953–54, 1958, 1960, 1963
- Kathleen M. Murphy, poetry in 1950-51 and 1959
- Seán Neeson on Carl Gilbert Hardebeck, 1965
- Michael O'Farrell on Achill, 1972
- An Seabhac 1941
- John D. Sheridan 1939
- Annie M. P. Smithson 1944.
- Francis Stuart 1944
- Maurice Walsh 1931
