= UPMC Kildare =

UPMC Kildare Hospital
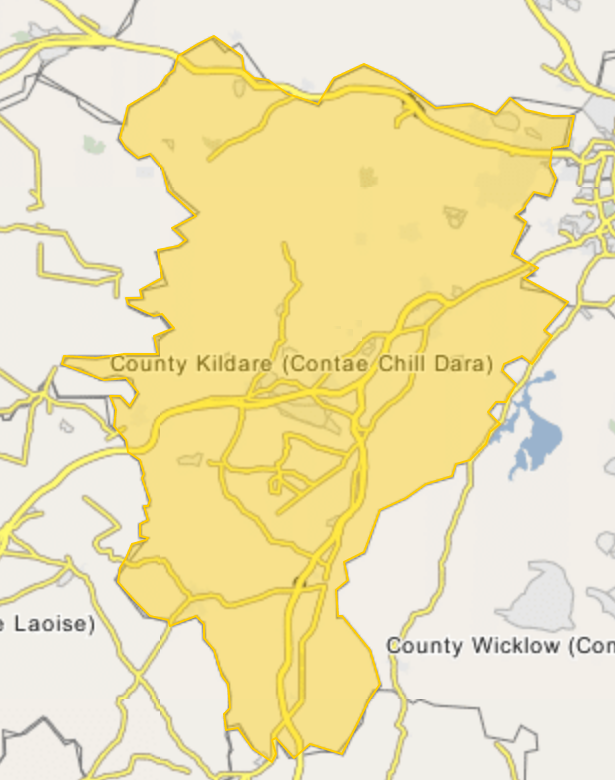
- Location within County Kildare

Geography
- Location: Prosperous Road, Clane, County Kildare, Ireland
- Coordinates: 53.289637°N 6.700812°W

Organisation
- Care system: Private
- Type: General
- Network: University of Pittsburgh Medical Center

Services
- Beds: 39

History
- Founded: October 1985

Links
- Website: www.upmc.ie/upmc-kildare
- Lists: Hospitals in the Republic of Ireland

UPMC Kildare Hospital, formerly known as Clane Hospital, is a private hospital located in Clane, County Kildare, Ireland. It is accredited by CHKS.

== History ==
The hospital was founded in October 1985 by Andrew Rynne, an Irish surgeon and the chairperson of the Irish Family Planning Association, and the Republic of Ireland's first vasectomy specialist.

The hospital used defective Poly Implant Prothèse breast implants prior to 2012.

UPMC Group bought Clane Hospital (now UPMC Kildare) in 2019.

== Services ==
UPMC Kildare offers urology, ENT, gynaecology, orthopaedic surgery, dental surgery, cataract surgery, endoscopy, dermatology and plastic surgery. Outpatient facilities include diagnostic imaging, physiotherapy, a fertility clinic and cardiology. UPMC Kildare does not have an emergency department.
