= Vasectomy reversal =

Medical procedure

- Specialty: Urology
- Frequency: Once

Vasectomy reversal is a term used for surgical procedures that reconnect the male reproductive tract after interruption by a vasectomy. Two procedures are possible at the time of vasectomy reversal: vasovasostomy (vas deferens to vas deferens connection) and vasoepididymostomy (epididymis to vas deferens connection). Although vasectomy is considered a permanent form of contraception, advances in microsurgery have improved the success of vasectomy reversal procedures. The procedures remain technically demanding and may not restore the pre-vasectomy condition.

== Procedure ==
=== Preparation ===
A general or regional anesthetic is most commonly used, as this offers the least interruption by patient movement for microsurgery. Local anesthesia, with or without sedation, can also be used. The procedure is generally done on a “come and go” basis. The actual operating time can range from 1–4 hours, depending on the anatomical complexity, skill of the surgeon and the kind of procedure performed.

=== Assessing biology ===
After anesthesia and scrubbing the scrotum with soap and water, the vas deferens is exposed through a small, 1–2 cm incision in the upper scrotum on each side. The vas deferens is cut sharply in half, both above and below the vasectomy site. A special bipolar microcautery is used to judiciously control any bleeding. One end of the vas deferens, termed the abdominal end, is inspected and flushed with salt solution to ensure that it is not blocked as it courses from the scrotum to the prostate (a “saline vasogram”). In order to assess for the presence of possible obstruction above the vasectomy site, the testicular end of the vas deferens can be compressed and inspected for fluid. This fluid is examined with a microscope for color, for consistency, and for sperm. This information is used by some surgeons to decide whether or not a secondary epididymal obstruction is present (see Table below).

| Grade | Vasal Fluid Findings | Procedure Suggested |
|---|---|---|
| 1 | Normal appearing sperm with motility | Vasovasostomy |
| 2 | Mostly normal appearing, nonmotile | Vasovasostomy |
| 3 | Mostly sperm heads without tails, nonmotile | Vasovasostomy |
| 4 | Only sperm heads | Vasovasostomy |
| 5 | No sperm, creamy fluid | Vasoepididymostomy |
| 6 | No fluid | Vasoepididymostomy |
| 7 | Clear fluid, no sperm | It depends |

If sperm are found at the testicular end of the vas deferens, then it is assumed that a secondary epididymal obstruction has not occurred and a vas deferens-to-vas deferens reconnection (vasovasostomy) is planned. If sperm are not found, then some surgeon consider this to be prime facie evidence that an epididymal obstruction is present and that an epididymis to vas deferens connection (vasoepididymostomy) should be considered to restore sperm flow. Other, more subtle findings that can be observed in the fluid—including the presence of sperm fragments and clear, good quality fluid without any sperm—require surgical decision-making to successfully treat. There are however, no large randomised prospective controlled trials comparing patency or pregnancy rates following the decision to perform either microsurgical vasovasostomy to microsurgical vasoepididymosty as determined by this paradigm.

=== Vasovasostomy ===
For a vasovasostomy, two microsurgical approaches are most commonly used. Neither has proven superior to the other. What has been shown to be important, however, is that the surgeon use optical magnification to perform the vasectomy reversal. One approach is the modified 1-layer vasovasostomy and the other is a formal, 2-layer vasovasostomy.

=== Vasoepididymostomy ===
A vasoepididymostomy involves a connection of the vas deferens to the epididymis. This is necessary when there is no sperm present in the vas deferens.

== Success rates ==
=== Success rates: patency ===
With vasectomy reversal surgery, there are two typical measures of success: patency rate, or return of some moving sperm to the ejaculate after vasectomy reversal, and pregnancy rates. In one study 95% of men with a vasovasostomy were found to have motile sperm in the ejaculate within 1 year after vasectomy reversal. Almost 80% of these men achieved sperm motility within 3 months of vasectomy reversal. The case for vasoepididymostomy is different. Fewer men will eventually achieve motile sperm counts and the time to achieve motile sperm counts is longer.

Additional information:

- The age of the patient at the time of vasectomy reversal does not appear to matter. Using different age cut-offs, including <35, 36-45, and > 45 years old, no differences in patency rates were detected in a recent vasectomy reversal series.
- The patency rates after vasovasostomy appear equivalent when performed in the straight or convoluted segments of the vas deferens

Another issue to consider is the likelihood of vasoepididymostomy at the time of vasectomy reversal, as this technique is generally associated with lower patency and pregnancy rates than vasovasostomy. Web-based, computer models and calculations have been proposed and published that described the chance of needing an vasoepididymostomy at reversal surgery.

=== Success rates: pregnancy ===
The pregnancy rate is often seen as a more reliable way of measuring the success of a vasectomy reversal than the patency rates, as they measure the real-life success of whether the man succeeds in the aim of having a new child.

It is important to appreciate that female age is the single most powerful factor determining the pregnancy rate following any fertility treatment and vasectomy reversal is no exception. No large studies have stratified the results of vasectomy reversal by female age and hence assessing outcomes is confounded by this issue.

Pregnancy rates range widely in published series, with a large study in 1991 observing the best outcome of 76% pregnancy success rate with vasectomy reversals performed within 3 years or less of the original vasectomy, dropping to 53% for reversals 3–8 years out from the vasectomy, 44% for reversals 9–14 years out from the vasectomy, and 30% for reversals 15 or more years after the vasectomy. BPAS cites the average pregnancy success rate of a vasectomy reversal is around 55% if performed within 10 years, and drops to 25% if performed over 10 years. Higher success rates are found with reversal of vasovasostomy than those with a vasoepididymostomy, and factors such as antisperm antibodies and epididymal dysfunction are also implicated in success rates.

== Failure and complications ==
=== Failure ===
The current measure of success in vasectomy reversal surgery is achievement of a pregnancy. There are several reasons why a vasectomy reversal may fail to achieve this:

1. A pregnancy involves two partners. Although the count and quality of sperm may be sufficiently high after vasectomy reversal surgery, female fertility factors may play an indirect role in pregnancy success. If the female partner’s age is >35 years old, the couple should consider a female factor evaluation to determine if they have adequate reproductive potential before a vasectomy reversal is undertaken. This evaluation can be done by a gynecologist and should include a cycle day 3 FSH and estradiol levels, an assessment of menstrual cycle regularity, and a hysterosalpingogram to evaluate for fibroids.
2. Approximately 50%-80% of men who have had vasectomies develop a reaction against their own sperm (i.e., antisperm antibodies). High levels of these proteins directed against sperm may impair fertility, either by making it hard for sperm to swim to the egg or by interrupting the way the sperm must interact with the egg. Sperm-bound antibodies are usually assessed >6 months after the vasectomy reversal if no pregnancy has ensued. Treatment options include steroid treatment, intrauterine insemination (IUI) and in vitro fertilization (IVF) techniques.
3. Occasionally, scar tissue develops at the site where the vas deferens is reconnected, causing a blockage. Depending on the physician, this occurs in 5-10% of vasovasostomies and up to 35% of vasoepididymostomies. Depending on when it occurs, it may be treated with anti-inflammatory medication or could necessitate repeat vasectomy reversal surgery.
4. If an epididymal blowout has occurred and is not discovered at the time of vasectomy reversal surgery, the vasectomy reversal will probably fail. In this case, a vasoepididymostomy would need to be performed.
5. When the vas deferens has been blocked for a long time, the epididymis is adversely affected by elevated pressure. As sperm are nurtured to maturity within the normal epididymis, sperm counts may be sufficiently high to achieve a pregnancy, but sperm movement may be poor. Antioxidants, vitamins (A, C and E), or other supplements are recommended by some centers after vasectomy reversal for this reason. Some patients gradually recover from this epididymal dysfunction. Those patients whose sperm continue to have problems may require IVF to achieve a pregnancy.

=== Complications ===
In general, vasectomy reversal is a safe procedure and complication rates are low. There are small chances of infection or bleeding, the latter of which can result in a hematoma or blood clot in the scrotum that needs surgical drainage. If there is significant scar tissue encountered during the vasectomy reversal, fluid other than blood (seroma) can also accumulate in a small number of cases. Painful granulomas, caused by leaking sperm, can develop near the surgical site in some cases. Very rare complications include compartment syndrome or deep venous thrombosis from prolonged positioning, testis atrophy due to damaged blood supply, and reactions to anesthesia.

== Alternatives: assisted reproduction ==
Assisted reproduction uses “test tube baby” technology (also called in vitro fertilization, IVF) for the female partner along with sperm retrieval techniques for the male partner to help build a family. This technology, including intracytoplasmic sperm injection (ICSI), has been available since 1992 and became available as an alternative to vasectomy reversal soon after. This alternative should be discussed with couples during a consultation for vasectomy reversal.

Procedure to extract sperm for IVF include percutaneous epididymal sperm aspiration (PESA procedure), testicular sperm extraction (TESE procedure) and open testicular biopsy. Needle aspiration in a PESA procedure invariably causes trauma to the epididymal tubule and TESE procedures may damage the intra testicular collecting system (rete testis). Both potentially compromise the prospect of successful vasectomy reversal. Conversely, because in most circumstances vasectomy reversal leads to the restoration of sperm in the semen, it reduces the need for sperm retrieval procedures in association with IVF.

Published research attempts to identify the issues that matter most as couples decide between IVF-ICSI and vasectomy reversal, two very different approaches to family building. This research has generally taken the form of cost-effectiveness or cost-benefit analyses and decision analyses and Markov modeling. Since it is difficult to perform randomized, blinded prospective trials on couples in this situation, analytic modeling can help uncover what variables affect outcomes the most. From this body of work, it has been observed that vasectomy reversal can be the most cost-effective way to build a family if: (a) the female partner is reproductively healthy, and (b) the surgeon can achieve good vasectomy reversal outcomes. If the surgeon can achieve high “patency” rates (moving sperm in the ejaculate) after vasectomy reversal, then vasectomy reversal is competitive with IVF-ICSI. In the special instance of couples with advanced maternal age (defined as a female partner > 38 years old), case series’ have reported that pregnancy rates with vasectomy reversal are competitive with IVF-ICSI. When Markov modeling was applied to probe the issue of pregnancy rates after reversal surgery in more depth, the results revealed that female reproductive health is far more important than: (a) the age of the vasectomy, (b) the age of the man, or (c) the vasectomy reversal patency rate. Ultimately the decision to pursue a vasectomy reversal is a personal one for each couple.

== Patient expectations ==
Every patient who is considering vasectomy reversal should undergo a screening visit before the procedure to learn as much as possible about his current fertility potential. At this visit, the patient can decide whether he is a good candidate for vasectomy reversal and assess if it is right for him. Issues to be discussed at this visit include:

- Female partner’s history of past pregnancies
- Male’s medical and surgical history
- Complications during or after the vasectomy
- Female partner’s age, menstrual cycle and fertility
- Brief physical examination to assess male reproductive tract anatomy
- A review of the vasectomy reversal procedure, its nature, benefits and risks, and complications
- Alternatives to vasectomy reversal
- Freezing of sperm at the time of vasectomy reversal
- Questions about the surgery, the success rates, and recovery
- Analysis of hormones such as testosterone or FSH in selected cases to better determine whether sperm production is normal

Immediately before the procedure, the following information is important for patients:

- They should eat normally the night before the vasectomy reversal, but follow the directions that anesthesia recommends for the morning of the reversal. If no specific directions are given, all food and drink should be withheld after midnight and on the morning of the surgery.
- Stop taking aspirin, or any medications containing ibuprofen (Advil, Motrin, Aleve), at least 10 days prior to vasectomy reversal, as these medications have a side effect that can reduce platelet function and therefore lower blood clotting ability.
- Be prepared to be driven home or to a hotel after the vasectomy reversal

After the procedure, patients should perform the following tasks:

- Remove dressings from inside the athletic supporter in 48 hours; continue with the scrotal support for 1 week. Shower once the dressings are removed.
- Wear athletic supporter at all times for the first 4 weeks.
- Apply frequent ice packs (or frozen peas, any brand) to the scrotum the evening after the vasectomy reversal and the day after that for 24 hours to reduce swelling.
- Take prescribed pain medication as directed.
- Resume a normal, well-balanced diet upon returning home or to the hotel. Drinks plenty of fluids.
- Normal, non-vigorous activity can be restarted after 48 hours or when feeling better. Activities that cause discomfort should be stopped for the time being. Heavy activities such as jogging and weight lifting can be resumed in 2 to 4 weeks depending on the particular procedure.
- Refrain from sexual intercourse for 4 weeks depending on the procedure and the surgeon’s recommendations.
- The semen is checked for sperm at between 6 and 12 weeks post-operatively and then depending on the results may be requested monthly semen analyses are then obtained for about 6 months or until the semen quality stabilizes.
- You may experience discomfort after the vasectomy reversal. Symptoms that may not require a doctor's attention are: (a) light bruising and discoloration of the scrotal skin and base of penis. This will take one week to go away. b) limited scrotal swelling (a grapefruit is too large); (c) small amounts of thin, clear, pinkish fluid may drain from the incision for a few days after reversal surgery. Keep the area clean and dry and it will stop.
- If you received general anesthesia, a sore throat, nausea, constipation, and general "body ache" may occur. These problems should resolve within 48 hours.
- Consider calling a provider for the following issues: (a) wound infection as suggested by a fever, a warm, swollen, red and painful incision area, with pus draining from the site. Antibiotics are necessary to treat this. (b) scrotal hematoma as suggested by extreme discoloration (black and blue) of the skin and continuing scrotal enlargement from bleeding underneath. This can cause throbbing pain and a bulging of the wound. If the scrotum continues to hurt more and continues to enlarge after 72 hours, then it may need to be drained.

== Biological considerations ==
Sperm are produced in the male sex gland or testicle. From there they travel through tubes (efferent tubules), exit the testes and enter a “storage site” or epididymis. The epididymis is a single, 18-foot-long (5.5 m), tightly coiled, small tube, within which sperm mature to the point where they can move, swim and fertilize eggs. Testicular sperm are not able to fertilize eggs naturally (but can if they are injected directly into the egg in the laboratory), as the ability to fertilize eggs is developed slowly over several months of storage in the epididymis. From the epididymis, a 14-inch, 3 mm-thick muscular tube called the vas deferens carries the sperm to the urethra near the base of the penis. The urethra then carries the sperm through the penis during ejaculation. A vasectomy interrupts sperm flow within the vas deferens. After a vasectomy, the testes still make sperm, but because the exit is blocked, the sperm die and eventually are reabsorbed by the body.

A problem in the delicate tubes of epididymis can develop over time after vasectomy. The longer the time since the vasectomy, the greater the “back-pressure” behind the vasectomy. This “back-pressure” may cause a “blowout” in the delicate epididymal tubule, the weakest point in the system. The blowout may or may not cause symptoms, but will probably scar the epididymal tubule, thus blocking sperm flow at second point. To summarize, with time, a man with a vasectomy can develop a second obstruction deeper in the reproductive tract that can make the vasectomy more difficult to reverse. Having the skill to detect and fix this problem during vasectomy reversal is the essence of a skilled surgeon. If the surgeon simply reconnects the two freshened ends of the vas deferens without examining for a second, deeper obstruction, then the procedure can fail, as sperm-containing fluids are still unable to flow to the place of the connection. In this case, the vas deferens must be connected to the epididymis in front of the second blockage, to bypass both blockages and allow the sperm to reenter the urethra in the ejaculate. Since the epididymal tubule is much smaller (0.3 mm diameter) than the vas deferens (3 mm diameter, 10-fold larger), epididymal surgery is far more complicated and precise than the simple vas deferens-to-vas deferens connection.

== Prevalence ==
Vasectomy is a common method of contraception worldwide, with an estimated 40-60 million individuals having the procedure and 5-10% of couples choosing it as a birth control method. In the USA, about 2% of men later go on to have a vasectomy reversal afterwards. However the number of men inquiring about vasectomy reversals is significantly higher - from 3% to 8% - with many "put off" by the high costs of the procedure and pregnancy success rates (as opposed to "patency rates") only being around 55%. 90% of men are satisfied with having had the procedure.

While there are a number of reasons that men seek a vasectomy reversal, some of these include wanting a family with a new partner following a relationship breakdown / divorce, their original wife/partner dying and subsequently going on re-partner and to want children, the unexpected death of a child (or children - such as by car accident), or a long-standing couple changing their mind some time later often by situations such as improved finances or existing children approaching the age of school or leaving home. Patients often comment that they never anticipated such situations as a relationship breakdown or death (of their partner or child) may affect their situation. A small number of vasectomy reversals are also performed in attempts to relieve post-vasectomy pain syndrome.

In the UK, 16% of all men under 70 have had a vasectomy, and with remarriages accounting for 40% of all marriages, there are a significant proportion of men finding themselves in a new relationship and regretting their decision to have a vasectomy. Combined with longer life histories, the rate of divorce and remarriage is thought to be driving the increase in vasectomy reversals and inquiries for vasectomy reversals in recent times.

== History ==
Technical advances in vasectomy reversal mirror those in microsurgery over the past 100 years. As a discipline, microsurgery was first performed by Carl Nylen in Sweden for middle ear surgery in 1910, but grew most rapidly as a discipline in the 20th century stimulated by its success in microvascular reconstruction of war-injured soldiers. The first microsurgical vasectomy reversal was performed by Earl Owen in 1971.
