= Lord Alexander =

Lord Alexander may refer to:

- Harold Alexander, 1st Earl Alexander of Tunis (1891–1969)
- Robert Alexander, Baron Alexander of Weedon (1936–2005)
