= Vasovasostomy =

Surgery to reverse vasectomy

- ICD-9-CM: 63.82
- MeSH: D014669

Vasovasostomy (literally connection of the vas to the vas) is a surgery by which vasectomies are partially reversed. Another surgery for vasectomy reversal is vasoepididymostomy.

== History ==
Vasovasostomy is a form of microsurgery first performed by Australian surgeon Dr. Earl Owen (1934–2014) in 1971.

== Limitations ==
In most cases the vas deferens can be reattached but, in many cases, fertility is not achieved. There are several reasons for this, including blockages in the vas deferens, and the presence of autoantibodies which disrupt normal sperm activity. If blockage at the level of the epididymis is suspected, a vasoepididymostomy can be performed.

Return of sperm to the ejaculate depends greatly on the length of time from the vasectomy and the skill of the surgeon. Generally, the shorter the interval, the higher the chance of success. The likelihood of pregnancy can depend on female partner factors.

Over half of men who have undergone a vasectomy develop anti-sperm antibodies. The effects of anti-sperm antibodies continue to be debated in the medical literature, but there is agreement that antibodies may reduce sperm motility.

== Successful vasovasostomy ==
Only two conditions must be satisfied for sperm to be returned to a patient's semen with vasectomy reversal by vasovasostomy. First, the patient must have sperm available to pass through at least one reconnection. The second condition is that each reconnection must be as watertight as possible. The surgeon's goal is to achieve a very precise circumferential reconnection of the sperm canal edges by using meticulously placed microsurgical sutures.

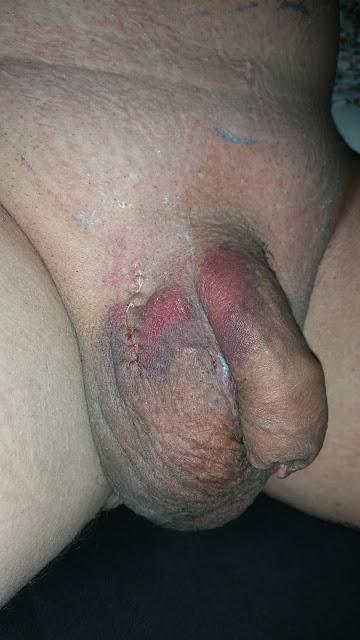
Haematoma on penis and scrotum 24 hours after microsurgical vasovasostomy

== Procedure ==
Vasovasostomy can be performed in the convoluted or straight portion of the vas deferens.

Vasovasostomy is typically an out-patient procedure (patient goes home the same day).

The procedure is typically performed by urologists. Most urologists specializing in the field of male infertility perform vasovasostomies using an operative microscope for magnification, under general or regional anesthesia.

If sperm were seen in one or both vas contents at the time of surgery, or sperm reached the patient's semen only transiently after the reversal, microsurgical vasovasostomy may be successful. Unfortunately, surgeons performing only an occasional vasectomy reversal often neglect examining the vas contents for presence or absence of sperm. A surgeon cannot determine sperm presence or absence by the naked eye. The most common cause for failed vasectomy reversals is the inappropriate non-microsurgical technique using sutures that are too large to achieve watertight reconnections. The failure of a competently performed microsurgical vasovasostomy following the absence of any sperm in the contents of each vas usually is due to “blowouts” in the epididymides. Under these circumstances an operation should be performed only by a micro-surgeon with proven vasoepididymostomy expertise, bypassing the blowouts.

== Prognosis ==
The prognosis for each patient should be determined by a pre-operative examination of the vasectomy sites and consideration of the time interval since vasectomy.

== Rate of pregnancy ==
The rate of pregnancy depends on such factors as the method used for the vasectomy and the length of time that has passed since the vasectomy was performed. The reversal procedures are frequently impermanent, with occlusion of the vas recurring two or more years after the operation.

The presence of sperm granulomas improves the likelihood of restoring sperm to the semen with a vasovasotomy. A local urologist can easily determine whether a patient has 0, 1, or 2 sperm granuloma by a painless examination of each vasectomy site. If the interval since the vasectomy is less than fifteen years, the prognosis will be 70% or better and this local examination is probably not needed.

A sperm granuloma develops from post-vasectomy sperm leakage, and it behaves like a safety valve, preventing internal pressure buildup and ruptures of the delicate epididymis tubules with subsequent obstructive scarring.

== Statistics ==
Vasovasostomy can be effective regardless of how long it's been since the original vasectomy. However, if more than 15 years have passed since the original vasectomy, one may have a lower chance of having enough healthy sperm in one's own semen to father a child. Also, the longer the obstructive interval, the more likely it is that a vasoepididymostomy will be required.

== Costs ==
Typical cost of one vasovasostomy is US$5,000–15,000 (one side).

== See also ==
- Tubal reversal, reversal of a tubal ligation
- Vasectomy reversal
- Vasitis nodosa
