= Sperm granuloma =

Lump of extravasated sperm found in some vasectomized men

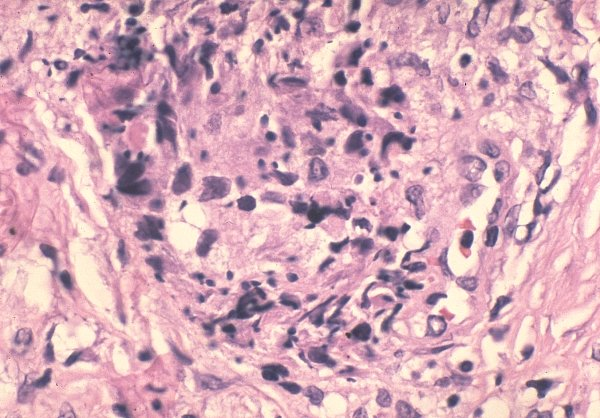
Post-traumatic leakage of sperm provoking a granulomatous reaction.

A sperm granuloma is a lump of leaked sperm that appears along the vasa deferentia or epididymides in vasectomized individuals. While the majority of sperm granulomas are present along the vas deferens, the rest of them form at the epididymis. Sperm granulomas range in size, from one millimeter to one centimeter. They consist of a central mass of degenerating sperm surrounded by tissue containing blood vessels and immune system cells. Sperm granulomas may also have a yellow, white, or cream colored center when cut open. While some sperm granulomas can be painful, most of them are painless and asymptomatic. Sperm granulomas can appear as a result of surgery (such as a vasectomy), trauma, or an infection (such as sexually transmitted diseases). They can appear as early as four days after surgery and fully formed ones can appear as late as 208 days later.

Sperm granulomas are a common complication of different types of vasectomy. In vasectomies, the vas deferens are cut and the two ends are tied to prevent sperm from passing. Sperm granuloma may then form at the point where the vas deferens were cut, due to the possibility of sperm leaking out at this site. History of trauma or inflammation of the epididymis can also lead to a sperm granuloma. Sperm granulomas are seen as the body's immune response to sperm being outside of their normal location, and are therefore seen as a protective mechanism.

Sperm granulomas are quite common after surgery, occurring in up to 40% of patients. On the contrary, sperm granulomas comprise only 2.5% of the general population. Amongst adolescents and pediatric patients, sperm granulomas are considered a rare phenomenon as this population does not undergo vasectomy often. The most common cause of sperm granuloma in pediatric and adolescent patients is often attributed to tumor obstruction, injury, or infection to the area.

While sperm granuloma is considered a complication in most cases, it allows decompression of the vas deferens and epididymis at the vasectomy site. This allows for successful future reversal of vasectomy given the good quality sperm in the vas fluid. Any surgery in the genital area can lead to castration anxiety.

== Diagnosis ==
Sperm granulomas are diagnosed using a microscope to examine tissues (histology) taken from the area, typically done with fine needle aspiration and occur within a few weeks of a vasectomy. An example of a histology based diagnosis supporting sperm granuloma would be a sperm core surrounded by inflammatory cells, apoptotic cells, and fibrous tissue. Often, there will be empty tubes with cellular debris near the granuloma. Additionally, physicians might use high frequency ultrasounds to aid in properly diagnosing epididymal conditions such as sperm granulomas. Using these ultrasounds provide a better view of the anatomy of the epididymis, which could prevent misdiagnosis of conditions such as testicular tumors or supernumerary testis (the presence of more than two testes).

== Signs and symptoms ==
Sperm granulomas appear as hard and firm nodules that do not exceed 1 cm in size. Sperm granulomas form in 20-50% of vasectomy procedures. An injury to the epididymal epithelium is caused by penetration of germ cells into the epididymal supportive tissue. This infiltration of germ cells allows for the pathogenesis of sperm granulomas. Moreover, the penetration of germ cells leads to inflammatory and autoimmune reactions that further increase the risk of sperm granuloma formation.

Sperm granuloma can also mimic the presence of an abnormal number of testis on ultrasound.

Sperm granulomas are mostly asymptomatic. However, they can cause pain and swelling of the epididymis, spermatic cord, and testis. The pain usually radiates to the groin, the junctional area between the abdominal wall and the thigh, and can imitate the feeling of kidney spasms.

== Development of a sperm granuloma ==
Sperm granuloma is a common complication of vasectomy. Vasectomies are a common, effective procedure for the sterilization of males. History of trauma or epididymitis can also lead to sperm granuloma. In vasectomies, the vas deferens are cut and the two ends are tied to prevent sperm from passing. Sperm granuloma may then grow at the point where the vas deferens were cut. This could happen two to three weeks post procedure. Sperm granuloma can also form from sperm leaking from the vas deferens into the surrounding interstitium. Leakage of sperm elicits an immune response which can lead to chronic inflammation. A histological examination can confirm a sperm granuloma by checking for inflammatory markers such as macrophages and lymphocytes surrounding the sperm core.

== Treatment and prevention ==
Most sperm granulomas are asymptomatic and absorbed over time. However, in more severe cases, non-steroidal anti-inflammatory drugs (NSAIDs) such as Ibuprofen may be used.

Surgery is very rarely performed. In cases where symptoms do not resolve in a reasonable amount of time and NSAID therapy is ineffective, the provider may choose to surgically resect the area where the pain is localized. Additionally, the stumps of the vas deferens can be burned and closed off in order to reduce the pain the patient is experiencing and prevent it from happening again.

When sperm granulomas are occasionally mistaken for other conditions, such as testicular tumors, a more complicated treatment approach such as an orchiectomy may be accidentally used.

Cauterization is a vasectomy method used to seal the vas deferens by utilizing heat or electricity to burn the lumen. Using thermal (heat) cautery instead of electrocautery can help prevent granulomas and nodular thickening.

Refraining from ejaculation for 1 week can potentially reduce the risk of developing a sperm granuloma.

There is also evidence that sperm granuloma formation may be linked to testosterone deficiency. Testosterone supplementation may reduce the inflammation related to sperm granulomas and potentially even prevent them from occurring. However, this evidence is only supported in animal models.

== Complications ==
There have been complications involving sperm granuloma. A pediatric case documented a 13 year old boy who was admitted to the hospital with edema and redness on his left hemiscrotum. Upon a physical examination, they found the scrotum to be enlarged, soft, red and painless. Initial sonographs detected possibility of inflammation of the testis and epididymis. The patient received anti-inflammatory and antibiotic treatment, and was examined again one week after treatment. The testis were still painless and now hardened. Upon a second reexamination five days later, low perfusion to the testis was detected. This testicular necrosis led the patient into an emergency operation. Histology determined there was a ruptured sperm granuloma that led to the testicular thrombosis and necrosis. Specifically, the walls of the vas deferens contained many growths of small ducts and gland-like structures, which came about as a response to the displacement of the sperm and fluid. The exact cause of his ruptured sperm granuloma was not determined, but it was found to be most likely a secondary response to inflammation and/or trauma.

Another complication with sperm granulomas has been being mistaken for a tumor due to its tumor-like appearance. A 45 year old man presented with right testicular chronic pain. He had completed a vasectomy 7 years ago. Upon physical examination and an ultrasound, a solid nodule in the right epididymis was found, and medical staff suspected a tumor. After findings of sperm that had undergone phagocytosis, a final diagnosis of sperm granuloma was determined.

== Effects on sperm quality and fertility ==
It is unknown whether sperm granulomas are definitively detrimental to sperm quality and fertility in humans. However, studies in donkeys have shown that sperm quality is only marginally affected. There was a lower percentage of sperm with intact plasma membranes; however, no effects on motility or morphology were observed. In some cases, the presence or absence of sperm granulomas may determine the success rate for vasectomy reversal.

It is believed that sperm granulomas may be protective because they can prevent the obstruction of the testicles and epididymis. Sperm granulomas are believed to reduce the pressure that is generated after vasectomy and prevent blockages of sperm output into the vas fluid during ejaculation. Therefore, there are no changes in the amount of sperm that are produced into the vas fluid.

== Sperm granulomas in animals ==
Additionally, sperm granulomas can exist in non-human species such as rats, dogs, horses, fish, etc. Non-human species exhibit the same causes for sperm granulomas, including infection, injury, and trauma to the epididymal region. For example, vasectomized rats were seen to also have a high prevalence of sperm granulomas post-operation while general populations of rats experienced a much lower prevalence of sperm granulomas. In the case of sperm granulomas within dogs, their presence is common amongst poorly performed vasectomies. This is consistent with the idea that these lesions form at the site where there is trauma or a chance for the sperm to leak outside of the vasa deferentia or epididymis. In multiple species, sperm granulomas have also been linked to the success rate of certain procedures such as vasectomy reversals, or vasovasostomy. There is also an association between sperm granuloma and antibodies produced against sperm antigens. In a case study on sperm granuloma and anti-sperm antibody count in donkeys, it was found that sperm granuloma resulted in an increase in IgA- and IgG-bound sperm in donkeys. They also found donkeys with sperm granuloma had a reduction of sperm motility and a reduction of the percentage of sperm with an intact plasma membrane. However there was no significant damage found in total sperm motility compared to healthy control donkeys. The extent to which sperm granuloma and anti-sperm antibodies affect donkey fertility is still yet to be determined by further research studies.
