= Caroline Deys =

British family planning doctor (1938–2019)

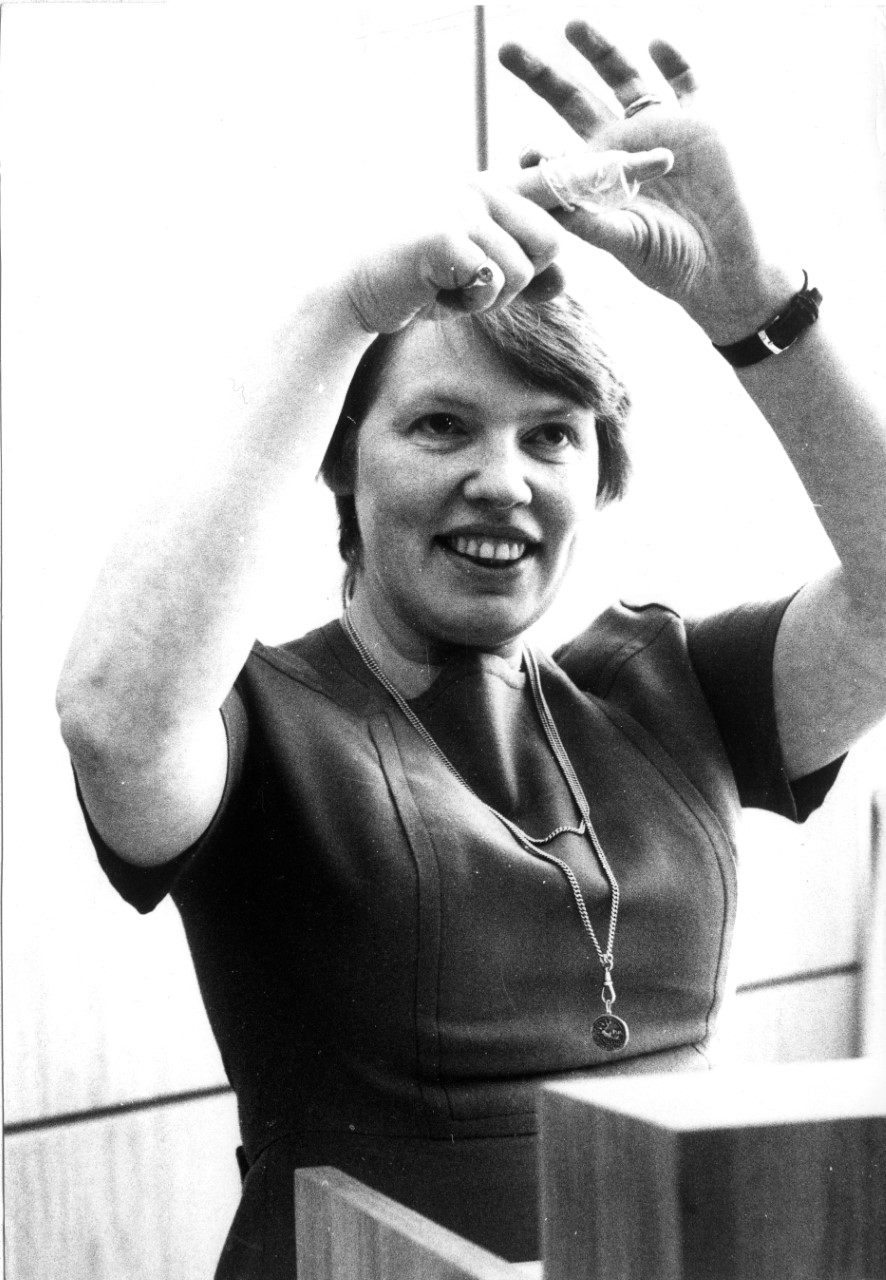
- Deys demonstrating a condom, 1972
- Born: Caroline Merula Deys; 2 July 1938
- Died: 6 May 2019 (aged 80); Islington, London, England
- Education: Barts

Caroline Merula Deys (2 July 1938 – 6 May 2019) was a British family planning doctor and later general practitioner. She won a key case against a General Medical Council complaint in 1972 that had been motivated by her work on legalising abortion in the UK. She performed around 4750 vasectomies in the 1970s, when she was the only female doctor specialising in the procedure in Europe.

== Early life ==
Deys was born to "Richard" Adolf Deys and Daisy Barragwanath. Her father was killed in a bombing raid early in World War II. Her mother re-married William Paterson Brown, a psychiatrist. She attended St Paul's Girls' School, then studied medicine at Barts medical school in London, graduating in 1962.

== Career and research ==
Having originally specialised in ophthalmology, she trained in family planning under Dorothy Morgan in the mid-1960s. She worked with her then husband, Malcolm Potts, on the successful campaign to legalise abortion in the UK, which led to the 1967 Abortion Act.

In 1967, she co-founded the Cambridge Advisory Centre with her husband and others, which provided contraceptive advice to young people, and she then developed and ran a domiciliary family planning service in Cambridgeshire in 1968-9. She often involved her baby daughter in her work and demonstrated the safety of the oral contraceptive by giving a pill to her young child.

Having trained in the procedure in India, she worked performing vasectomies at a clinic in London from 1970. She performed around 4750 in the 1970s.

In April 1972, Deys was featured in a spread in The Sunday People about her work and how she was the only female vasectomist in Europe. However, she was then brought before the General Medical Council (GMC) accused of a charge of serious professional misconduct relating to the article. The complaint was made by Philip Addison, then secretary of the Medical Defence Union (MDU), on behalf of a member. The text of the complaint claimed that she had "acquiesced in the publication of matter commending and drawing attention to her professional skill, knowledge and services" and that this was "for the purpose of promoting her own professional advantage." Advertising was contrary to GMC rules at the time, but similar newspaper articles about other doctors had not produced any action. Rather, Addison was motivated by his opposition to the legalisation of abortion; he had previously complained to the GMC about two abortion doctors in 1969.

The MDU and GMC were criticised over the case. Deys was defended by Robert Alexander and won her defence; the GMC revised its rules in response. The surrounding publicity was reported to have boosted the popularity of vasectomies.

Deys developed a theory relating contraceptive choice to cultural factors around gender. She noted that men in more patriarchal cultures preferred forms of contraception controlled by the man, like the condom and vasectomies. Couples in more gender equal cultures preferred forms of contraception controlled by the woman, like the oral contraceptive or tubal ligation.

In the 1980s, Deys switched to general practice, setting up practice in Highgate, London.

== Personal life ==
She married Malcolm Potts in 1966, with whom she had two children. She taught first aid for St John's Ambulance and was made a Serving Sister of the Order of St John in 1987. She became a Reader in the Church of England. She was later a Rotarian, being awarded their Paul Harris medal.

She died from complications caused by type 2 diabetes in the Whittington Hospital.

== Selected works ==
- Deys CM. Cultural aspects of male sterilisation. In: Abstracts of First International Planned Parenthood Federation, Southeast Asia and Oceania, Regional Medical and Scientific Congress, Sydney, 14–18 August 1972. Sydney, Australia, Family Planning Association of Australia, 1972. 50.
- Deys C, Dowling E, Goulding V. Clinical psychology: a consultative approach in general practice. Journal of the Royal College of General Practitioners 1989; 39 (325): 342–344.
