= Kathleen M. Murphy =

Irish poet

Kathleen M. Murphy (1879 – 22 March 1963) was an Irish poet and travel writer. During her lifetime, Murphy was regarded the most well-travelled Irish woman.

== Biography ==
Kathleen M. Murphy was born in Tulla, County Clare in 1879. She was educated at the Laurel Hill Convent in Limerick. She studied modern languages at University College Dublin. In 1932, Murphy won first prize in the Aonach Tailtean Literary Competition, and the Pro Ecclesia et Pontifice Papal decoration for her poetry.

Murphy travelled extensively from the late 1930s across Asia, Africa and South America, and wrote for various publications including The Capuchin Annual. In a letter to the editor of the Annual, Father Senan, with autobiographical notes for the 1945/46 edition in which she described herself as "Ireland's super-tramp!"

Murphy died in Birr, County Offaly on 22 March 1963.

== Bibliography ==
- Studies, March 1918 – June 1919, four poems.
- Poems, Dublin and Cork, Talbot Press, 1932.
- Capuchin Annual, 1950–51 and 1959, two poems.
