= Vasoepididymostomy =

Vasectomy reversal surgery

- Other names: Epididymovasostomy
- ICD-9-CM: 63.83

Vasoepididymostomy or epididymovasostomy is a surgery by which vasectomies are reversed. It involves connection of the severed vas deferens to the epididymis and is more technically demanding than the vasovasostomy.

For a vasectomy reversal that involves a vasoepididymostomy, there are two microsurgical approaches. The procedure involves a similar surgical incision as vasovasostomy; however, unlike with a vasovasostomy, the testis is usually delivered into the field for this more complex microsurgery. After the findings from the vasal fluid are reviewed showing epididymal obstruction, the epididymis is exposed by opening the outer testis covering (tunica vaginalis). The epididymis is inspected and an individual tubule is selected to enter and connect to the vas deferens. From this point on, one of two epididymovasostomy techniques is taken. In the mucosa-to-mucosa, end to side method, an opened epididymal tubule is connected to the cut end of the vas deferens with 4 to 6 small (10-0) simple sutures placed around the circumference of each. This "inner" layer is supported with an "outer" layer of radially placed 9-0 sutures to strengthen the connection. Recently, an "invagination" vasoepididymostomy was described as an alternative to the mucosa-to-mucosa method. With this technique, one, two or three "vest" sutures of 10-0 suture should be placed near the opening of the epididymal tubule to allow the epididymal tubule to "invaginate" into the vas deferens, theoretically creating a connection, that, based on studies in animal models, has an improved watertight seal and possibly a higher chance for success. Once the vas-deferens-epididymis connection is completed, the covering around the testis is replaced.

Vasoepididymostomy is often considered one of the most technically challenging operations in the field of urology. The procedure requires anastomosis of a single epididymal tubule (luminal diameter 0.15–0.25 mm) to the lumen of the vas deferens (diameter 0.3–0.4 mm), and is reserved for patients with congenital or acquired epididymal obstruction, or patients who have failed previous attempts at surgical reconstruction of the vas deferens. This surgery attaches the vas deferens directly to the epididymis, the coiled tube on the back of each testicle where sperm matures. A vasectomy can cause blockages or a break in the vas deferens or the epididymis. This surgery is used when a vasovasostomy won't work because sperm flow is blocked. The vas deferens is connected to the epididymis above the point of blockage.
