= Harry Clay Sharp =

American medical doctor and eugenicist (1870–1940)

Harry Clay Sharp (1870–1940) was an American medical doctor and eugenicist. While working as a physician at an Indiana state prison around the turn of the 20th century, Sharp performed some of the first vasectomies for the purposes of sterilization, and helped popularize the procedure as an alternative to castration. Sharp was instrumental in the creation of Indiana's 1907 law mandating the sterilization of "confirmed criminals, idiots, imbeciles, and rapists"; this was the first compulsory sterilization law in the United States, and would serve as a model for similar statutes adopted by other states.

== Biography ==
=== Early life ===
Sharp was born on December 18, 1870, in Charlestown, Indiana to parents Margaret and James Sharp. He was the first of nine children, two of whom died as infants.

He began studying medicine at Ohio State Medical School, completing his studies at the University of Louisville in Kentucky in 1893.

=== Career overview ===
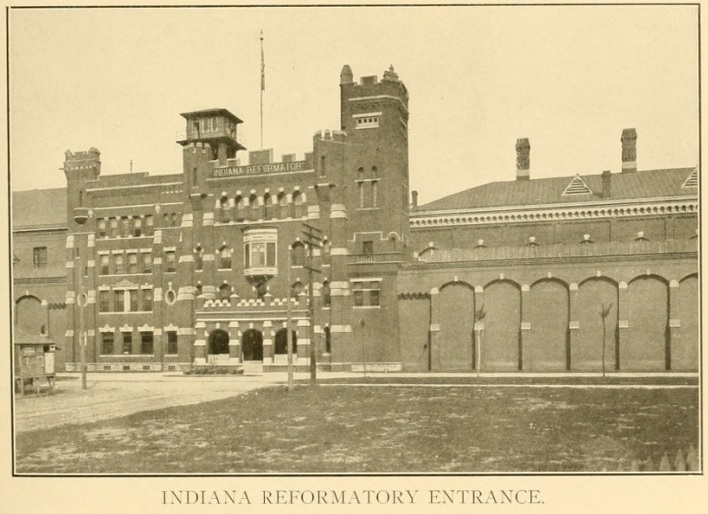
The Indiana Reformatory, where Sharp worked as a physician after graduating from medical school.

In 1895, he began working as a physician at the Indiana Reformatory in Pendleton, Indiana, a state prison which housed convicted criminals and mental patients. Sharp took an interest in policy, and was eventually named as State Hospital Superintendent for Indiana and served on the board of trustees of state institutions.

In 1910, Sharp opened a hospital in West Baden, Indiana with another doctor, C. W. Dowden. During World War I, Sharp was the head of the US Army Medical Corp's surgical operating unit in France.

After the war, Sharp briefly operated a private practice in Indianapolis. He then worked as a surgeon of the United States Public Health Service.

Finally, he worked for nine years as the chief medical officer of the United States Veterans Administration Hospital in Lyons, New Jersey.

=== Personal life ===
Sharp was married in 1925 to Lillian Marie Sharp. The two had a son, James C. Sharp.

Sharp died at the Veterans Administration Hospital on October 31, 1940, after a brief illness.

== Sterilization and eugenic advocacy ==
As a physician at the Indiana Reformatory, Sharp performed some of the first vasectomies in the United States, and helped popularize the practice as a eugenic measure to prevent "degenerate" individuals from producing "more of their kind". The vasectomy was developed in Sweden and England in 1890 as an experimental treatment for prostatitis (an enlarged prostate gland). The idea of using the procedure for the purposes of sterilization, particularly of degenerate individuals, was conceived by the Chicago physician Albert Ochsner, who published his ideas in an article in The Journal of the American Medical Association in 1899, where Sharp learned of them. Ochsner and Sharp conceived of vasectomy as a more humane alternative to castration, since it would preserve their sexual functioning.

Sharp performed his first vasectomy on 11 October 1899 on a nineteen-year-old inmate, Clawson, who was said to suffer from excessive masturbation. Sharp reported that the procedure cured the young man of his masturbation habit, as well as conferring a number of other health benefits such as weight gain and improved mood. Sharp asked Clawson to recruit more inmates into having the procedure done. Over time, Sharp shifted his emphasis away from the therapeutic benefits of vasectomy in treating sexual deviancy, and came to instead emphasise its eugenic purpose. By 1909, Sharp claimed, in his pamphlet Vasectomy, to have performed 456 vasectomies.

Beginning in 1901, Sharp urged the governor to pass a compulsory sterilization law. By 1907, he succeeded in convincing governor J. Frank Hanly to pass the first compulsory sterilization law in the United States. In the following years, several other states would pass similar laws, some consulting with Sharp. Harry Laughlin would go on to replace Sharp as the principal advocate for sterilization laws in the US.

Indiana's sterilization law was eventually overturned by state courts in 1919 (at which point Sharp had already ceased his advocacy for sterilization). Sharp never renounced his support of eugenic sterilization. More than 2,000 Indiana residents had been sterilized by 1974 before the practice ended.
