= No-scalpel vasectomy =

Vasectomy via puncture made without a scalpel

- Other names: Non-scalpel vasectomy, NSV, Keyhole vasectomy
- Specialty: Urology, family medicine, general surgery

No-scalpel vasectomy (also called non-scalpel vasectomy, keyhole vasectomy or NSV) is a type of vasectomy procedure in which a specifically designed ringed clamp and dissecting hemostat is used to puncture the scrotum to access the vas deferens. This is different from a conventional or incisional vasectomy where the scrotal opening is made with a scalpel. The NSV approach offers several benefits, including lower risk for bleeding, bruising, infection, and pain. The NSV approach also has a shorter procedure time than the conventional scalpel incision technique. Both approaches to vasectomy are equally effective. Because of the inherent simplicity of the procedure it affords itself to be used in public health programs worldwide. This method is used in over 40 countries for male sterilization.

== History ==
No-scalpel vasectomy was developed and first performed in China by Dr. Li Shunqiang with the aim of reducing men's fear related to the incision and increasing vasectomy use in China. In 1985, a team created by EngenderHealth visited his centre to learn the technique. One of the team members, Dr. Phaitun Gojaseni, introduced the no-scalpel technique in Thailand upon his return, while another member of the team, Dr. Marc Goldstein, introduced the technique to the United States at the NewYork–Presbyterian Hospital. Over time, the technique gained popularity and it is now a preferred method of male sterilization in many countries.

=== History of no-scalpel vasectomy in India ===
No-scalpel vasectomy was introduced in India in 1998. A team of Indian surgeons led by Dr RCM Kaza travelled to Chengdu, China, to learn the technique under the aegis of EngenderHealth and the UN. They then introduced the procedure in India, under the National Rural Health Mission. The Government of India then proceeded to introduce the procedure in every district of India as an alternative to tubal ligation offered to women.

World Vasectomy Day is celebrated on 7 November in India.

== Technical procedure ==
No-scalpel vasectomy is a day case (outpatient) procedure and the patient is fit to go home the same day.

The eligibility criteria for the no-scalpel vasectomy and the conventional vasectomy procedure are the same, although may vary from clinic to clinic.

=== Anaesthesia ===
No-scalpel vasectomy is performed under local anesthesia. Usually lidocaine 2 percent is infiltrated into the vas deferens and the puncture site on the scrotum. This makes the procedure pain free. Some patients may prefer to receive regional anesthesia.

=== Steps ===
The vas deferens is isolated by three-finger technique on both sides. The ideal entry point for the needle is midway between the top of the testes and the base of the penis. Usually, 100 mg lidocaine (without epinephrine) is injected to create a wheal. The no-scalpel vasectomy uses two specific instruments designed by Dr. Li Shunqiang. One is a ringed clamp and the other is a dissecting forceps. The ringed clamp is used to isolate and encircle the vas. The dissecting forceps is used to puncture the scrotal skin, spread tissues, and pierce the vas deferens to deliver it outside the scrotum. The vas deferens is then occluded.

==== Methods of occluding the vas deferens ====
The most commonly used methods to occlude the vas deferens include:

- Fascial interposition or burying one end of the cut vas deferens under tissue
- Folding back or folding and tying each end of the vas deferens so they do not face one another
- Tying with either sutures or clips
- Cauterizing of one or both ends

The American Urological Association recommends occlusion by one of the following methods to achieve highest efficacy:

- Cautery with or without fascial interposition
- Open ended vasectomy with one end of the vas open; the other end with cautery and fascial interposition
- Extended electrocautery

=== Complications ===
No-scalpel vasectomy has less pain, bleeding and infection than conventional vasectomy. No-scalpel vasectomy can also be done in less time and the individual is able to return to sexual activity sooner than traditional vasectomy surgery. However, sperm may still be present for 10–20 ejaculations, and some doctors may schedule a follow-up visit to confirm the success of the procedure. Additionally, there is approximately a 1 in 2,000 chance of pregnancy following a vasectomy, as some sperm may be able to cross the severed vas deferens.

Complications are rare and can include:

- Bleeding
- Hematoma (bruise)
- Surgical site infection
- Orchalgia (long-term pain of the testes)
