= Malcolm Potts =

British-American scientist (1935–2025)

Malcolm Potts FRCOG FREng
- Born: 8 January 1935; Sunderland, England
- Died: 25 April 2025 (aged 90); Berkeley, California, U.S.
- Education: Cambridge University
- Scientific career
- Fields: Reproductive health, Population, Family planning
- Workplaces: School of Public Health, University of California, Berkeley

David Malcolm Potts (8 January 1935 – 25 April 2025) was a British human reproductive scientist and professor of public health at the School of Public Health at the University of California, Berkeley.

Potts was the first holder of the Fred H. Bixby-endowed chair in Population and Family Planning and founding director of the Bixby Center for Population, Health, and Sustainability at the School of Public Health.

== Life and career ==
Potts was born in Sunderland, England on 8 January 1935. He completed a medical degree and a PhD in embryology (on the electron microscopy of mammalian implantation) at the University of Cambridge. While at Cambridge, he co-founded the first clinic offering contraception to young people. He advised David Steel on the UK's 1967 Abortion Act. He was the first male doctor at the Marie Stopes Clinic in London.

He became the first medical director of the International Planned Parenthood Federation in 1968. In 1972, he was the first physician to promote the technique of uterine manual vacuum aspiration. He then moved to the United States and became CEO of Family Health International (FHI) from 1978 to 1990. During this period, FHI became the largest global AIDS prevention programme outside of the World Health Organization.

Potts published ten books and over 350 scientific papers and articles. His books include Abortion (co-written with Peter Diggory and John Peel, 1977), Textbook of Contraceptive Practice (1st edition co-written with John Peel, 1969; 2nd edition co-written with Peter Diggory, 1983; long the key textbook in the field), Queen Victoria's Gene (written with his brother Prof. William Potts), Ever since Adam and Eve: The Evolution of Human Sexuality (written with Dr Roger Short, 1999) and Sex and War: How Biology Explains Warfare and Terrorism and Offers a Path to a Safer World (co-written with Thomas Hayden, 2008). He worked as a consultant to the World Bank and the British, American, Canadian and Egyptian governments.

He served as:

- Founding Director, The Bixby Center for Population, Health, and Sustainability, 1992–2013.
- Board member, Population Services International, Washington, DC.
- Board Member, Venture Strategies for Health and Development, Berkeley, CA.
- Chair, Division of Community Health and Human Development, School of Public Health.
- Chair, Committee for the Protection of Human Subjects, University of California, Berkeley.
- Head, Global Health Specialty Area, School of Public Health.
- Fellow, Royal Academy of Engineering, 2003.

Potts was married four times, including to Caroline Deys in 1966, and had four children. He died from Alzheimer's disease in Berkeley, California on 25 April 2025, at the age of 90.
