= Alice Curtayne =

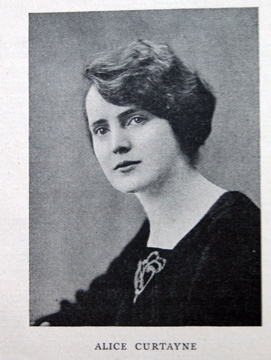
- Alice Curtayne (1898–1981)
- Born: 6 November 1898; Tralee, County Kerry, Ireland
- Died: 1981 (aged 82–83)
- Occupations: Writer, lecturer
- Spouse: Stephen Rynne
- Children: Andrew Rynne, Brigid Rynne, and two others
- Writing career
- Notable works: St. Catherine of Siena (1929), Patrick Sarsfield (1934), Francis Ledwidge: A Life of the Poet (1972)

Alice Curtayne (1898–1981) was an Irish writer and lecturer. She was born on 6 November 1898 at 2 Upper Castle St, Tralee, County Kerry. She was a daughter of John Curtayne, carriage builder, or coach builder, of Castle St, Tralee, by his wife Bridget Mary O'Dwyer.

She was educated at St. Anne's, Southampton. Married Stephen Rynne with two sons, one of whom. Andrew Rynne, a medical practitioner, became well known for his liberal views on birth control, and two daughters, one of whom, Brigid Rynne, later illustrated some of her books.

Her first book was a biography of Catherine of Siena (1929). After Catherine of Siena she wrote several works of nationalist history including a life of Patrick Sarsfield (1934). The novel House of Cards (1940) concerns an Irish girl who marries an Italian industrialist.

Alice lectured extensively in the US including at least three trans-American tours.

She gave the Medora A. Feehan Lectures in Irish History and Literature at Anna Maria College, Paxton, Massachusetts, USA in the Spring semester of 1959. The college awarded her an honorary Doctorate in Humane Letters and she was presented with the Key to Worcester City by Mayor James D. O'Brien.

In December 1954 The Irish Press sent her to Rome to write daily reports on the close of the Marian Year. She went to Rome again for the final session of the Second Vatican Council. She was commissioned to send weekly reports to local newspapers, The Nationalist (Carlow) and The Kerryman. She also sent a series of profiles of outstanding personages of this Vatican Council to The Universe and an article for Hibernia journal.

== Bibliography ==
Her works, chiefly biographical, include

- St. Catherine of Siena (1929),
- A Recall to Dante
- Labours in the Vineyard (a translation from the Italian Giovanni Papini)
- Saint Brigid of Ireland
- Saint Anthony of Padua
- House of Cards (a novel)
- Borne of the Wind (essays)
- Lough Derg
- Twenty Tales of Irish Saints ( For children)
- More Tales of Irish Saints (1957) Talbot Press. Illustrated by her daughter, Brigid Rynne
- Jean-Baptiste Debrabant
- Patrick Sarsfield (1934),
- The Trial of Oliver Plunkett (1953)
- The Irish Story (1962)
- Francis Ledwidge: A Life of the Poet (1972).
- The Complete works of Francis Ledwidge

She also wrote for several newspapers. Also many articles in the Dublin published & internationally distributed journal Capuchin Annual (1930 to 1977)
