= Peter Diggory =

Dr Peter Lionel Carr Diggory (6 January 1924 – 22 November 2009) was an English gynaecologist and one of the first to support calls for the legalisation of abortion in the United Kingdom. He was the central medical figure in the Abortion Law Reform Association in the 1960s and medical adviser to David Steel's Private Member's Bill that became the Abortion Act 1967.

== Biography ==
Diggory was born in Titley, Herefordshire. Diagnosis with polio as a child interrupted Diggory's schooling, but he went on to attend Royal Grammar School Worcester. He studied mathematics at University College London, leading to work with C. P. Snow on the development of radar in the Second World War. After the war, he studied medicine at University College Hospital, where he met his future wife, Patricia (died 2002), with whom he had two children.

He became a consultant gynaecologist at Queen Charlotte's and Westminster hospitals, where he came to support legalising abortion. At Kingston Hospital, where he was appointed a consultant in 1961, he was responsible the care of the 400 women admitted each year suffering from the complications arising from illegal abortions. In a study published in The Lancet, based on 1,000 histories, he was able to demonstrate the potential safety of abortion. David Steel's Private Member's Bill was introduced to Parliament in 1966 and Diggory was involved in the campaign supporting it.

He later became a consultant at The Royal Marsden and Kingston hospitals, specialising in cancer surgery.

His books included Abortion (co-written with Malcolm Potts and John Peel, 1977) and the second edition of Textbook of Contraceptive Practice (co-written with Potts, 1983; long the key textbook in the field).

In his final years, he had vascular dementia and he would die of heart failure.
