= Vasitis nodosa =

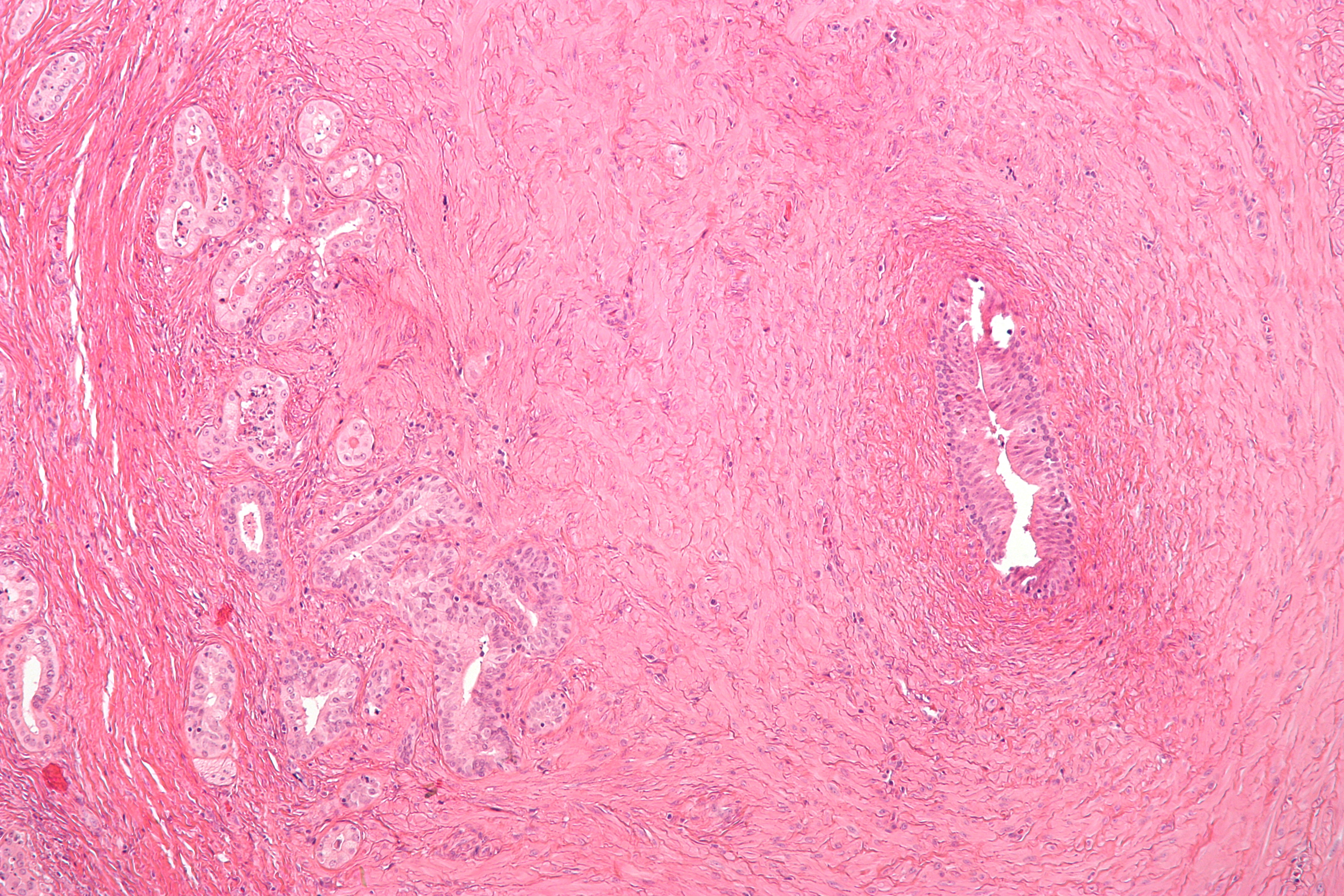
- Micrograph of vasitis nodosa (left of image). H&E stain.
- Specialty: Urology

Vasitis nodosa is a complication experienced in approximately 66% of men who undergo vasectomy. It is a benign nodular thickening of the vas deferens, in which small offshoots proliferate, infiltrating surrounding tissue. It can be mistaken for low-grade adenocarcinoma by pathologists, and is implicated in late vasectomy failure.

== See also ==
- Salpingitis isthmica nodosa
