= Andrew Rynne =

Irish surgeon, medical practitioner (born 1942)

- Born: May 18, 1942 (age 83); Prosperous, County Kildare
- Occupations: General practitioner Surgeon
- Years active: 1973–present
- Known for: Birth control supporter

Andrew Rynne is a retired Irish surgeon, medical practitioner and founder of Clane General Hospital in County Kildare. Rynne was the chairperson of the Irish Family Planning Association and the Republic of Ireland's first vasectomy specialist. He was known for his liberal approach to birth control.

== Early life and education ==
Rynne was born on 18 May 1942 in Downings House in Prosperous, County Kildare. His father was Stephen Rynne, a writer, broadcaster, and author, while his mother, Alice Curtayne, was a writer, hagiographer, lecturer, linguist and scholar. From 1961 to 1968, he attended Royal College of Surgeons in Ireland. After graduation, Rynne emigrated to Canada with an internship with Hamilton Civic Hospital.

== Career ==
He started his general practise in Mitchell, Ontario from 1968 to 1973, where he was introduced to vasectomy. In 1970, he was appointed as the coroner for the Perth County, Ontario. In January 1974, he returned to Ireland and established a general practise in Clane, County Kildare.

In 1975, Rynne joined Irish Family Planning Association (IFPA) and started doing vasectomies for them. In 1984, he sold condoms as an act of civil disobedience and got fined £500. In the following year, he became the Chairman of IFPA. In the same year, he founded Clane General Hospital with the opposition from the Catholic Church and the local supporters.

== Shooting ==
In 1990, Rynne was shot by a former client. According to Rynne, the gunman fired six or seven times with a .22 Long Rifle and shot him in the right hip. The incident is the subject of a short film The Vasectomy Doctor by Paul Webster.

== Bibliography ==
- Smoking is Your Decision. Ward River Press 1982
- Abortion. The Irish Question. Ward River Press 1983
- The Vasectomy Doctor. Mercier Press 2005
- The Reverend Psychopath. Self-published, Amazon, 2023. A biography about Rev. Samuel Cotton and his wife Eliza who founded an orphanage in Kildare in 1866.
- The Foxhunter. To be published 2024. A novel based on a true story of medical negligence that gave rise to Ireland's Right to Die case 1995.

== Cultural connections ==
Known in Irish traditional music circles as Andy Rynne, he was a source for several songs recorded by Christy Moore, including "The Dark Eyed Sailor" and "The Cliffs of Doneen". Moore's album Prosperous was recorded in the basement of Downings House, the Rynne family home.

== See also ==
- Vasectomy
