= John D. Sheridan =

Irish writer

John Desmond Sheridan (1903–1980) was an Irish novelist, short story writer, and humourist. He was a frequent contributor to the Irish Independent newspaper. In addition to his novels and essays, he also published several books of poetry, and authored a biography of poet James Clarence Mangan in 1937.

Sheridan released several short stories. Most of his stories are of a humorous nature and are often about his phobias or pet hates.

== Bibliography ==
Fiction

- Vanishing Spring
- Here's Their Memory
- Paradise Alley
- The Magnificent MacDarney
- God Made Little Apples
- The Rest is Silence

Humorous Essays

- I Can't Help Laughing
- I Laugh to Think
- Half in Earnest
- My Hat Blew Off
- The Right Time
- While the Humour is on Me
- Funnily Enough
- Bright Intervals
- Joking Apart
- Include Me Out
- It Stance to Reason (The Intelligent Rabbit's Guide to Golf)

Poetry

- Joe's no Saint and Other Poems
- Stirabout Lane

Other

- James Clarence Mangan - a Biography
- The Hungry Sheep: Catholic Doctrine Restated against Contemporary Attacks
- New Pence for Old: An Introduction to the New Decimal Currency
- An Outline Geography
- Ireland in Colour (with Kenneth Scowen)
