= Robert Alexander, Baron Alexander of Weedon =

British barrister, banker and Conservative politician

The Right Honourable The Lord Alexander of Weedon QC FRSA
- Alexander in March 1978

Member of the House of Lords
- Lord Temporal
- Life peerage 11 July 1988 – 6 November 2005

Personal details
- Born: 5 September 1936 Newcastle-under-Lyme, Staffordshire, England
- Died: 6 November 2005 (aged 69) Lambeth, London, England
- Occupation: Barrister, Chancellor of the University of Exeter

Robert Scott Alexander, Baron Alexander of Weedon (5 September 1936 – 6 November 2005) was a British barrister, banker and Conservative politician.

== Education ==
He was educated at Brighton College (of which he was later President) and King's College, Cambridge.

== Career at law ==
He was called to the Bar at the Middle Temple in 1961. An early case of note was his successful defence of Dr Caroline Deys before the General Medical Council in 1972. Alexander was one of the leading barristers of his generation and served as Chairman of the Bar Council 1985–86. As a barrister he came to greater public fame representing Lord Archer in his libel case against the Daily Star in 1987.

He retired from the Bar in 1989, and served as Chairman of National Westminster Bank from 1989 to 1999. He was also a director of other companies, a member of the Government's Panel on Sustainable Development and Chairman of the Royal Shakespeare Company from 2000 until ill-health forced him to retire in 2004. He served the MCC as its president and chairman. He was chancellor of the University of Exeter from 1998 to 2005. He was also the chair of JUSTICE, the human rights and law reform group, from 1990 to 2005 and served on the Wakeham Commission's report into the reform of the House of Lords. He was Treasurer of Middle Temple in 2001.

== Peerage ==
When offered a peerage, Alexander requested that he be "of Weedon," a very small village in Buckinghamshire, just north of Aylesbury, where he had lived for some years with his third wife, Marie, at Weedon Lodge. He and his family were hosts to the annual Weedon Jazz evening for several years, used to raise money for the village. Alexander was created a life peer as Baron Alexander of Weedon, of Newcastle-under-Lyme in the County of Staffordshire, on 11 July 1988. He sat on the Conservative Party benches.

== Family ==
He was married three times and died from a stroke in 2005, aged 69.

Coat of arms of Robert Alexander, Baron Alexander of Weedon

Crest
Upon a chapeau Gules encircled by a coronet rayonny Or and turned up Ermine a lion sejant Or head and mane Gules collared ermine supporting by its staff Or spearheaded also Or a banner of the arms fringed Argent and Gules.
Escutcheon
Per fess Azure and Gules between two swords in pale points upward Argent hilts pommels and quillons Or a tower Argent pierced of a cross Gules masoned proper and with a portcullis Or infess with two towers each issuant in the flanks masoned and with a portal Gold.
Supporters
Dexter, a lamb statant erect in trian aspect collared Ermine unguled Or; Sinister, a lion statant erect Or head and mane in trian aspect Gules collared Ermine.
Motto
I Plead To Serve

Academic offices
Preceded by Sir Rex Richards	Chancellor of the University of Exeter; 1998–2005	Succeeded by Floella Benjamin
