= Monospecific antibody =

Monospecific antibodies are antibodies whose specificity to antigens is singular (mono- + specific) in any of several ways: antibodies that all have affinity for the same antigen; antibodies that are specific to one antigen or one epitope; or antibodies specific to one type of cell or tissue. Monoclonal antibodies are monospecific, but monospecific antibodies may also be produced by other means than producing them from a common germ cell. Regarding antibodies, monospecific and monovalent overlap in meaning; both can indicate specificity to one antigen, one epitope, or one cell type (including one microorganism species). However, antibodies that are monospecific to a certain tissue, or all monospecific to the same tissue because clones, can be polyvalent in their epitope binding.

== Production ==
=== Hybridoma cell ===
Monoclonal antibodies are typically made by fusing the spleen cells from a mouse that has been immunized with the desired antigen with myeloma cells. However, recent advances have allowed the use of rabbit B-cells.

=== PrEST ===
Another way of producing monospecific antibodies are by PrESTs. A PrEST (protein epitope signature tag) is a type of recombinantly produced human protein fragment. They are inserted into an animal, e.g. rabbit, which produces antibodies against the fragment. These antibodies are monospecific against the human protein.

== Cautions ==
Recent research has led to the discovery that unstable hinged monospecific antibodies may engage in a process leading to a decrease in their apparent avidity/affinity. This process, termed Fab arm exchange, has led to theories about the dissemination of viral infections in patients given monospecific IgG4 therapeutic antibodies. Evidence is suggestive that this process is linked to the dissemination of PML in patients given Tysabri for MS. Following dosing unpredictability still reigns and mutations in the hinge of the antibody which may prevent Fab-arm exchange in-vivo should be considered when designing therapeutic antibodies.

== See also ==
- Monoclonal antibodies
