= Vasectomy =

Surgical procedure for male sterilization

Background
- Type: Sterilization
- First use: 1899 (experiments from 1785)

Failure rates (first year)
- Perfect use: 0.10%
- Typical use: 0.15% "Vas-Clip" nearly 1%

Usage
- Duration effect: Permanent
- Reversibility: Possible
- User reminders: A negative semen specimen is required to verify no sperm.
- Clinic review: All

Advantages and disadvantages
- STI protection: No
- Benefits: No need for general anesthesia. Lower cost and less invasive than tubal ligation for females.
- Risks: Temporary local inflammation of the testes, long-term genital pain.

Vasectomy is an elective surgical procedure that results in male sterilization, often as a means of permanent contraception. During the procedure, the vasa deferentia are cut and tied or sealed so as to prevent sperm from entering into the urethra and thereby prevent fertilization of ova through sexual intercourse. Vasectomies are usually performed in a physician's office, medical clinic, or, when performed on a non-human animal, in a veterinary clinic. Hospitalization is not normally required as the procedure is not complicated, the incisions are small, and the necessary equipment routine.

There are several methods by which a surgeon might complete a vasectomy procedure, all of which occlude (i.e., "seal") at least one side of each vas deferens. To help reduce anxiety and increase patient comfort, those who have an aversion to needles may consider a "no-needle" application of anesthesia while the 'no-scalpel' or 'open-ended' techniques help to accelerate recovery times and increase the chance of healthy recovery.

Due to the simplicity of the surgery, a vasectomy usually takes less than 30 minutes to complete. After a short recovery at the doctor's office (usually less than an hour), the patient is sent home to rest. Because the procedure is minimally invasive, many vasectomy patients find that they can resume their typical sexual behavior within a week, and do so with little or no discomfort.

Because the procedure is considered a permanent method of contraception and is not easily reversed, patients are frequently counseled and advised to consider how the long-term outcome of a vasectomy might affect them both emotionally and physically. Vasectomies require the consent of the male only, and like with other forms of sterilisation or birth control, only the consent of the patient (not partners, their spouse or families) is required. A vasectomy without the patient's consent or knowledge constitutes forced sterilization.

== Medical uses ==
A vasectomy is done to prevent fertility in males. It ensures that in most cases the person will be sterile after confirmation of success following surgery. The procedure is regarded as permanent because vasectomy reversal is costly and often does not restore the male's sperm count or sperm motility to prevasectomy levels. Those with vasectomies have a very small (nearly zero) chance of successfully impregnating someone, but a vasectomy does not protect against sexually transmitted infections (STIs).

After vasectomy, the testes remain in the scrotum where Leydig cells continue to produce testosterone and other male hormones that continue to be secreted into the bloodstream.

When the vasectomy is complete, sperm cannot exit the body through the penis. Sperm is still produced by the testicles but is broken down and absorbed by the body. Much fluid content is absorbed by membranes in the epididymis, and much solid content is broken down by the responding macrophages and reabsorbed via the bloodstream. After vasectomy, the membranes must increase in size to absorb and store more fluid; this triggering of the immune system causes more macrophages to be recruited to break down and reabsorb more solid content. Within one year after vasectomy, sixty to seventy percent of those vasectomized develop antisperm antibodies. In some cases, vasitis nodosa, a benign proliferation of the ductular epithelium, can also result. The accumulation of sperm increases pressure in the vas deferens and epididymis. The entry of the sperm into the scrotum can cause sperm granulomas to be formed by the body to contain and absorb the sperm which the body will treat as a foreign biological substance (much like a virus or bacterium).

=== Efficacy ===
Risks of vasectomy
| Frequency | Risk |
|---|---|
| 1 in 1400 | Unwanted pregnancy (failure of vasectomy) |
| 1 in 11 | For comparison: unwanted pregnancy w/ typical use of pill |
| 1 in 6 | For comparison: unwanted pregnancy w/ typical use of condom |
| 1 in 40 | Infection after surgery |
| 1 in 7 | Pain at 7 months after vasectomy |
| 1 in 110 | Pain at 7 months affecting quality of life |

Vasectomy is the most effective permanent form of contraception available to males. (Removing the entire vas deferens would very likely be more effective, but it is not something that is regularly done.) In nearly every way that vasectomy can be compared to tubal ligation it has a more positive outlook. Vasectomy is more cost effective, less invasive, has techniques that are emerging that may facilitate easier reversal, and has a much lower risk of postoperative complications.

Early failure rates, i.e. pregnancy within a few months after vasectomy, typically result from unprotected sexual intercourse too soon after the procedure while some sperm continue to pass through the vasa deferentia. Most physicians and surgeons who perform vasectomies recommend one (sometimes two) postprocedural semen specimens to verify a successful vasectomy; however, many people fail to return for verification tests citing inconvenience, embarrassment, forgetfulness, or certainty of sterility. In January 2008, the FDA cleared a home test called SpermCheck Vasectomy that allows patients to perform postvasectomy confirmation tests themselves; however, compliance for postvasectomy semen analysis in general remains low.

Late failure, i.e. pregnancy following spontaneous recanalization of the vasa deferentia, has also been documented. This occurs because the epithelium of the vas deferens (similar to the epithelium of some other human body parts) is capable of regenerating and creating a new tube if the vas deferens is damaged and/or severed. Even when as much as five centimeters (or two inches) of the vas deferens is removed, the vas deferens can still grow back together and become reattached—thus allowing sperm to once again pass and flow through the vas deferens, restoring one's fertility.

The Royal College of Obstetricians and Gynaecologists states there is a generally agreed-upon rate of late failure of about one in 2000 vasectomies—better than tubal ligations for which the failure rate is one in every 200 to 300 cases. A 2005 review including both early and late failures described a total of 183 recanalizations from 43,642 vasectomies (0.4%), and 60 pregnancies after 92,184 vasectomies (0.07%).

== Complications and concerns ==
Short-term possible complications include infection, bruising and bleeding into the scrotum resulting in a collection of blood known as a hematoma. A 2012 study demonstrated an infection rate of 2.5% postvasectomy. The stitches on the small incisions required are prone to irritation, though this can be minimized by covering them with gauze or small adhesive bandages. The primary long-term complications are chronic pain conditions or syndromes that can affect any of the scrotal, pelvic or lower-abdominal regions, collectively known as post-vasectomy pain syndrome.

Complications not withstanding, many men express concerns regarding potential adverse effects of vasectomy. The risk of testicular cancer is not affected by vasectomy. In 2014, the American Urological Association reaffirmed that vasectomy is not a risk factor for prostate cancer and that it is not necessary for physicians to routinely discuss prostate cancer in their preoperative counseling of men undergoing vasectomy. A 2017 meta-analysis found no statistically significant increase in risk of prostate cancer. A 2019 study of 2.1 million Danish males found that vasectomy increased their incidence of prostate cancer by 15%. A 2020 meta-analysis found that vasectomy increased the incidence by 9%. Other studies agree on the 15% increase in risk of developing prostate cancer, but found that people who get a vasectomy are not more likely to die from prostate cancer than those without a vasectomy.

=== Postvasectomy pain ===
Post-vasectomy pain syndrome is a chronic and sometimes debilitating condition that may develop immediately or several years after vasectomy. The most robust study of post-vasectomy pain, according to the American Urology Association's Vasectomy Guidelines of 2012 (amended 2015) surveyed people just before their vasectomy and again seven months later. Of those that responded and who said they did not have any scrotal pain prior to vasectomy, 7% had scrotal pain seven months later which they described as "Mild, a bit of a nuisance", 1.6% had pain that was "Moderate, require painkillers" and 0.9% had pain that was "quite severe and noticeably affecting their quality of life". Post-vasectomy pain can be constant orchialgia or epididymal pain (epididymitis), or it can be pain that occurs only at particular times such as with sexual intercourse, ejaculation, or physical exertion.

=== Psychological effects ===
A 1990 study indicated that some 90% of men are generally reported in reviews as being satisfied with having had a vasectomy, while 7–10% of people regret their decision.

Younger people who receive a vasectomy are significantly more likely to regret and seek a reversal of their vasectomy, with one study showing people in their twenties being 12.5 times more likely to undergo a vasectomy reversal later in life (and including some who chose sterilization at a young age). Pre-vasectomy counseling is often emphasised for younger patients.

== Procedure ==
The traditional incision approach of vasectomy involves numbing of the scrotum with local anesthetic (although some people's physiology may make access to the vas deferens more difficult in which case general anesthesia may be recommended) after which a scalpel is used to make two small incisions, one on each side of the scrotum at a location that allows the surgeon to bring each vas deferens to the surface for excision. The vasa deferentia are cut (sometimes a section may be removed altogether), separated, and then at least one side is sealed by ligating (suturing), cauterizing (electrocauterization), or clamping. There are several variations to this method that may improve healing, effectiveness, and which help mitigate long-term pain such as post-vasectomy pain syndrome or epididymitis, however the data supporting one over another are limited.

- Fascial interposition: Recanalization of the vas deferens is a known cause of vasectomy failure(s). Fascial interposition ("FI"), in which a tissue barrier is placed between the cut ends of the vas by suturing, may help to prevent this type of failure, increasing the overall success rate of vasectomy while leaving the testicular end within the confines of the fascia. The fascia is a fibrous protective sheath that surrounds the vas deferens as well as all other body muscle tissue. This method, when combined with intraluminal cautery (where one or both sides of the vas deferens are electrically "burned" closed to prevent recanalization), has been shown to increase the success rate of vasectomy procedures.
- No-needle anesthesia: Fear of needles for injection of local anesthesia is well known. In 2005, a method of local anesthesia was introduced for vasectomy which allows the surgeon to apply it painlessly with a special jet-injection tool, as opposed to traditional needle application. The numbing agent is forced/pushed onto and deep enough into the scrotal tissue to allow for a virtually pain-free surgery. Lidocaine applied in this manner typically achieves anesthesia within 10 to 20 seconds. Initial surveys show a very high satisfaction rate amongst vasectomy patients. Once the effects of no-needle anesthesia set in, the vasectomy procedure is performed in the routine manner. However, unlike in conventional local anesthesia where needles and syringes are used on one patient only, the applicator is not single use and can only be properly disinfected by autoclaving.
- No-scalpel vasectomy (NSV): Also known as a "key-hole" vasectomy, is a vasectomy in which a sharp hemostat (as opposed to a scalpel) is used to puncture the scrotum. This method has come into widespread use as the resulting smaller "incision" or puncture wound typically limits bleeding and hematomas. Also the smaller wound has less chance of infection, resulting in faster healing times compared to the larger/longer incisions made with a scalpel. The surgical wound created by the no-scalpel method usually does not require stitches. NSV is the most commonly performed type of minimally invasive vasectomy, and both describe the method of vasectomy that leads to access of the vas deferens.

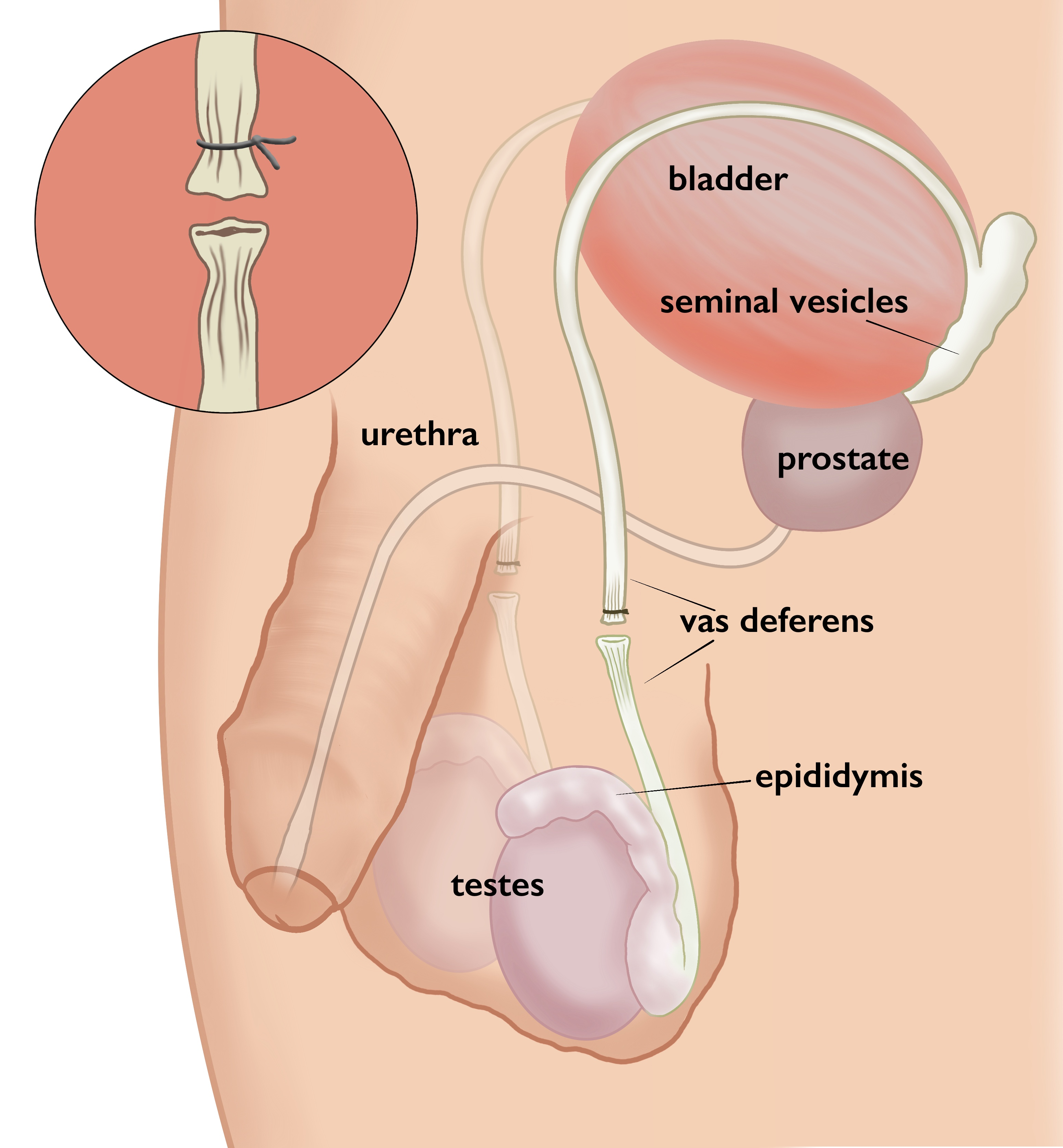
Open-ended vasectomy

- Open-ended vasectomy: In this procedure the testicular end of the vas deferens is not sealed, which allows continued streaming of sperm into the scrotum. This method may avoid testicular pain resulting from increased back-pressure in the epididymis. Studies suggest that this method may reduce long-term complications such as post-vasectomy pain syndrome.
- Vas irrigation: Injections of sterile water or euflavine (which kills sperm) are put into the distal portion of the vas at the time of surgery which then brings about a near-immediate sterile ("azoospermatic") condition. The use of euflavine does however, tend to decrease time (or, number of ejaculations) to azoospermia vs. the water irrigation by itself. This additional step in the vasectomy procedure, (and similarly, fascial interposition), has shown positive results but is not as prominently in use, and few surgeons offer it as part of their vasectomy procedure.

=== Other techniques ===
The following vasectomy methods have purportedly had a better chance of later reversal but have seen less use by virtue of known higher failure rates (i.e., recanalization). An earlier clip device, the VasClip, is no longer on the market, due to unacceptably high failure rates. The VasClip method, though considered reversible, has had a higher cost and resulted in lower success rates. Also, because the vasa deferentia are not cut or tied with this method, it could technically be classified as other than a vasectomy. Vasectomy reversal (and the success thereof) was conjectured to be higher as it only required removing the Vas-Clip device. This method achieved limited use, and scant reversal data are available.

==== Vas occlusion techniques ====
- Injected plugs: There are two types of injected plugs which can be used to block the vasa deferentia. Medical-grade polyurethane (MPU) or medical-grade silicone rubber (MSR) starts as a liquid polymer that is injected into the vas deferens after which the liquid is clamped in place until is solidifies (usually in a few minutes).
- Intra-vas device: The vasa deferentia can also be occluded by an intra-vas device (IVD). A small cut is made in the lower abdomen after which a soft silicone or urethane plug is inserted into each vas tube thereby blocking (occluding) sperm. This method allows for the vas to remain intact. IVD technique is done in an out-patient setting with local anesthetic, similar to a traditional vasectomy. IVD reversal can be performed under the same conditions making it much less costly than vasovasostomy which can require general anesthesia and longer surgery time.

Both vas occlusion techniques require the same basic patient setup: local anesthesia, puncturing of the scrotal sac for access of the vas, and then plug or injected plug occlusion. The success of the aforementioned vas occlusion techniques is not clear and data are still limited. Studies have shown, however, that the time to achieve sterility is longer than the more prominent techniques mentioned in the beginning of this article. The satisfaction rate of patients undergoing IVD techniques has a high rate of satisfaction with regard to the surgery experience itself.

=== Recovery ===
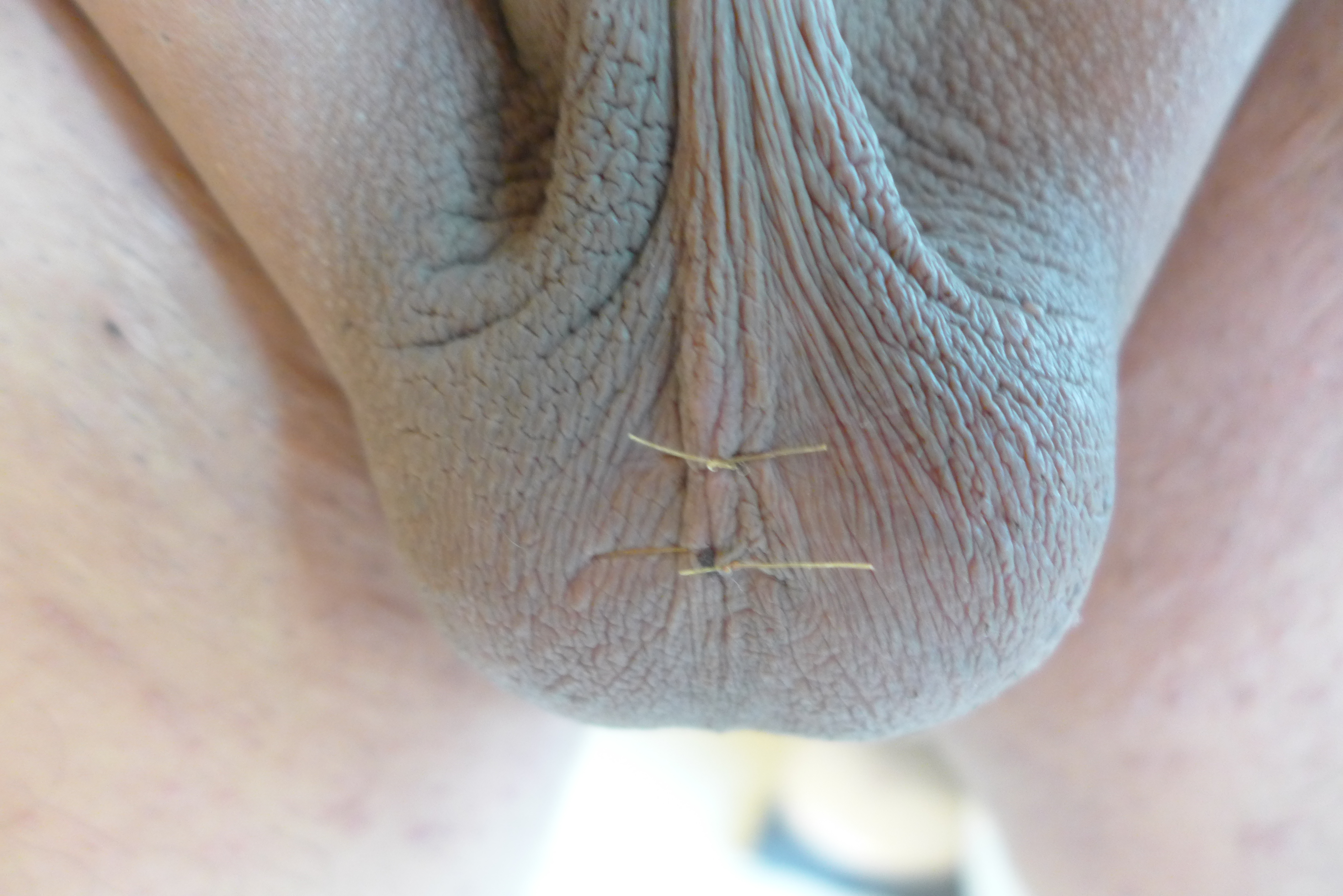
Incision stitches and a shaved scrotum

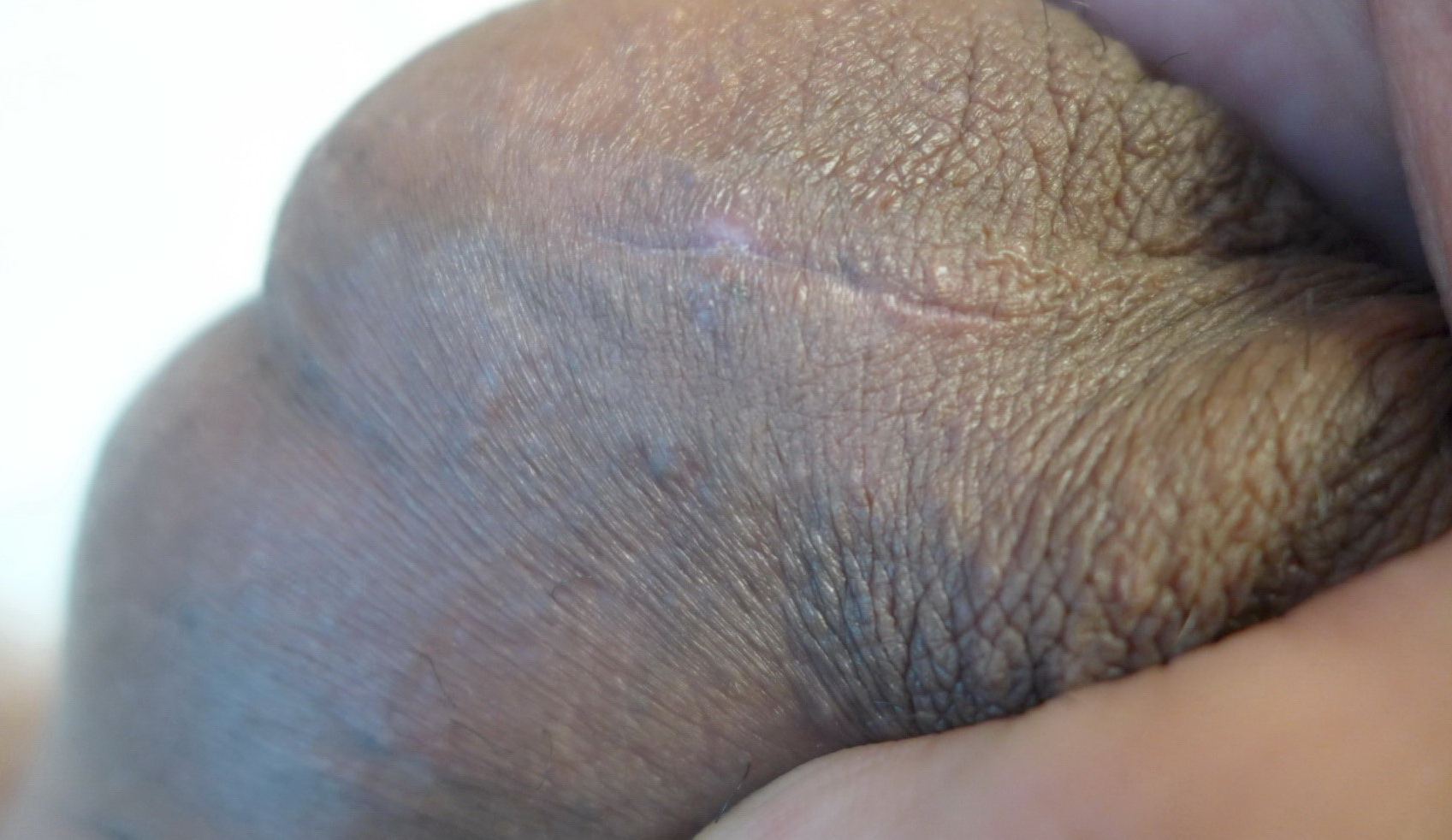
14 days after vasectomy surgery

Sexual intercourse can usually be resumed in about a week (depending on recovery); however, pregnancy is still possible as long as the sperm count is above zero. Another method of contraception must be relied upon until a sperm count is performed either two months after the vasectomy or after 10–20 ejaculations have occurred.

After a vasectomy, contraceptive precautions must be continued until azoospermia is confirmed. Usually two semen analyses at three and four months are necessary to confirm azoospermia. The British Andrological Society has recommended that a single semen analysis confirming azoospermia after sixteen weeks is sufficient.

Post-vasectomy, testicles will continue to produce sperm cells. As before vasectomy, unused sperm are reabsorbed by the body.

== Conceiving after vasectomy ==
In order to allow the possibility of reproduction via artificial insemination after vasectomy, some opt for cryopreservation of sperm before sterilization. Dr Allan Pacey, senior lecturer in andrology at Sheffield University and secretary of the British Fertility Society, notes that those he sees for a vasectomy reversal which has not worked express wishing they had known they could have stored sperm. Pacey notes, "The problem is you're asking a man to foresee a future where he might not necessarily be with his current partner—and that may be quite hard to do when she's sitting next to you."

The cost of cryo-preservation (sperm banking) may also be substantially less than alternative vaso-vasectomy procedures, compared to the costs of in-vitro fertilization (IVF) which usually run from $12,000 to $25,000.

Sperm can be aspirated from the testicles or the epididymides, and while there is not enough for successful artificial insemination, there is enough to fertilize an ovum by intracytoplasmic sperm injection. This avoids the problem of antisperm antibodies and may result in a faster pregnancy. IVF may be less costly per cycle than reversal in some health-care systems, but a single IVF cycle is often insufficient for conception. Disadvantages include the need for procedures on the woman, and the standard potential side-effects of IVF for both the mother and the child.

=== Vasectomy reversal ===
Vasectomies are not always reversible. There is a surgical procedure to reverse vasectomies using vasovasostomy (a form of microsurgery first performed by Earl Owen in 1971). Vasovasostomy is effective at achieving pregnancy in a variable percentage of cases, and total out-of-pocket costs in the United States are often upwards of $10,000. The typical success rate of pregnancy following a vasectomy reversal is around 55% if performed within 10 years, and drops to around 25% if performed after 10 years. After reversal, sperm counts and motility are usually much lower than pre-vasectomy levels.

Approximately 2% of men who have undergone vasectomy will undergo a reversal within 10 years of the procedure. A small number of vasectomy reversals are also performed in attempts to relieve post-vasectomy pain syndrome.

== Prevalence ==
Internationally, vasectomy rates are vastly different. While female sterilisation is the most widely used method worldwide, with 223 million women relying on it, only 28 million women rely on their partner's vasectomy. In the world's 69 least developed countries less than 0.1% of males use vasectomies on average. Of 54 African countries, only ten report measurable vasectomy use and only Eswatini, Botswana, and South Africa exceed 0.1% prevalence.

Prevalence of vasectomies
| Country | Vasectomy usage | Notes |
|---|---|---|
| Canada | 22% | |
| UK | 17% – 21% | only range given |
| New Zealand | 17% – 21% | only range given |
| South Korea | 17% – 21% | only range given |
| Australia | ~10% | |
| Belgium | ~10% | |
| Denmark | ~10% | |
| Spain | ~10% | |
| Switzerland | ~10% | |
| Nepal | 7.8% | |
| Brazil | 5.1% | |
| Colombia | 3.4% | |
| Eswatini | 0.3% | |
| Botswana | 0.4% | |
| South Africa | 0.7% | |

In North America and Europe vasectomy usage is on the order of 10% with some countries reaching 20%. Despite its high efficacy, in the United States, vasectomy is utilized less than half the rate of the alternative female tubal ligation. According to the research, vasectomy in the US is least utilized among black and Latino populations, the groups that have the highest rates of female sterilization.

New Zealand, in contrast, has higher levels of vasectomy than tubal ligation; 18% of all males, and 25% of all married males, have had a vasectomy. The age cohort with the highest level of vasectomy was 40–49, where 57% of males had taken it up. Canada, the UK, Bhutan and the Netherlands all have similar levels of uptake.

== History ==
The first human vasectomies were performed in the late 19th century. The procedure was initially used mainly as a treatment for prostate enlargement and as a eugenic method for sterilizing "degenerates". Vasectomy as a method of voluntary birth control began during the Second World War.

The first recorded vasectomy was performed on a dog in 1823. The first human vasectomies were performed to treat benign prostatic hyperplasia, or enlargement of the prostate. Castration had sometimes been used as a treatment for this condition in the 1880s, but, given the serious side effects, doctors sought alternative treatments. The first to suggest vasectomy as an alternative to castration may have been James Ewing Mears (in 1890), or Jean Casimir Félix Guyon. The first human vasectomy is thought to have been performed by Reginald Harrison. By 1900, Harrison reported that he had performed more than 100 vasectomies with no adverse outcomes.

In the late 1890s, vasectomy also came to be proposed as a eugenic measure for the sterilization of men considered unfit to reproduce. The first case report of vasectomy in the United States was in 1897, by A. J. Ochsner, a surgeon in Chicago, in a paper titled, "Surgical treatment of habitual criminals". He believed vasectomy to be a simple, effective means for stemming the tide of racial degeneration widely believed to be occurring. In 1902, Harry C. Sharp, the surgeon at the Indiana Reformatory, reported that he had sterilized 42 inmates in an effort to both reduce criminal behavior in those individuals and prevent the birth of future criminals.

Eugen Steinach (1861–1944), an Austrian physician, believed that a unilateral vasectomy (severing only one of the two vasa deferentia) in older individuals could restore general vigor and sexual potency, shrink enlarged prostates, and cure various ailments by somehow boosting the hormonal output of the vasectomized testicle. This surgery, which became very popular in the 1920s, was undertaken by many wealthy individuals, including Sigmund Freud and W. B. Yeats. Since these operations lacked rigorous controlled trials, any rejuvenating effect was likely due to the placebo effect, and with the later development of synthetic injectable hormones, this operation fell out of vogue.

Vasectomy began to be regarded as a method of consensual birth control during the Second World War. The first vasectomy program on a national scale was launched in 1954 in India. In the 1970s, India enacted a coercive sterilization campaign which resulted in millions of vasectomies. Today, India's sterilization program focuses on coercing poor women.

== Society and culture ==
=== Availability and legality ===
Vasectomy costs are (or may be) covered in different countries, as a method of both contraception or population control, with some offering it as a part of a national health insurance. The procedure was generally considered illegal in France until 2001, due to provisions in the Napoleonic Code forbidding "self-mutilation". No French law specifically mentioned vasectomy until a 2001 law on contraception and infanticide permitted the procedure.

The U.S. Affordable Care Act (signed into law in 2010) does not cover vasectomies, although eight states require state-health insurance plans to cover the cost. These include: Illinois, Maryland, New Jersey, New Mexico, New York, Oregon, Vermont and Washington.

In 2014, the Iranian parliament voted for a bill that would ban the procedure.

=== Impact of legal changes (US) ===
An analysis of medical records of 217 million people in the U.S. compared tubal sterilization and vasectomy rates in the last six months of 2021 with rates in the last six months of 2022—just after the Dobbs ruling (i.e. the overturning of Roe vs Wade) in June 2022. Although the effect of Dobbs was different in various social groups, it had a strong impact on those under age 30 with their vasectomy rates increasing by 59%, and tubal sterilization rates increasing by 29%.

=== Tourism ===
Medical tourism, where a patient travels to a less-developed location where a procedure is cheaper to save money and combine convalescence with a vacation, is infrequently used for vasectomy due to its low cost, but is more likely to be used for vasectomy reversal. Many hospitals list vasectomy as being available. Medical tourism has been scrutinized by some governments for quality of care and postoperative care issues.

=== Shooting of Andrew Rynne ===
In 1990, Andrew Rynne, chairperson of the Irish Family Planning Association, and the Republic of Ireland's first vasectomy specialist, was shot by a former client, but he survived. The incident is the subject of a short film, The Vasectomy Doctor, by Paul Webster.

== Non-human animals ==
Vasectomy is regularly performed on bulls.

Vasectomy has been proposed as an alternative to neutering for feral cats, as they maintain their position in the breeding hierarchy instead of letting intact males take over.

== See also ==
- Caroline Deys, a noted vasectomy specialist
- Castration
- List of surgeries by type
- Male contraceptive
- Orchiectomy
- Testicular sperm extraction
- World Vasectomy Day
- Vasectomy reversal
