= Urology =

Medical specialty on the urinary and reproductive systems

Urologist
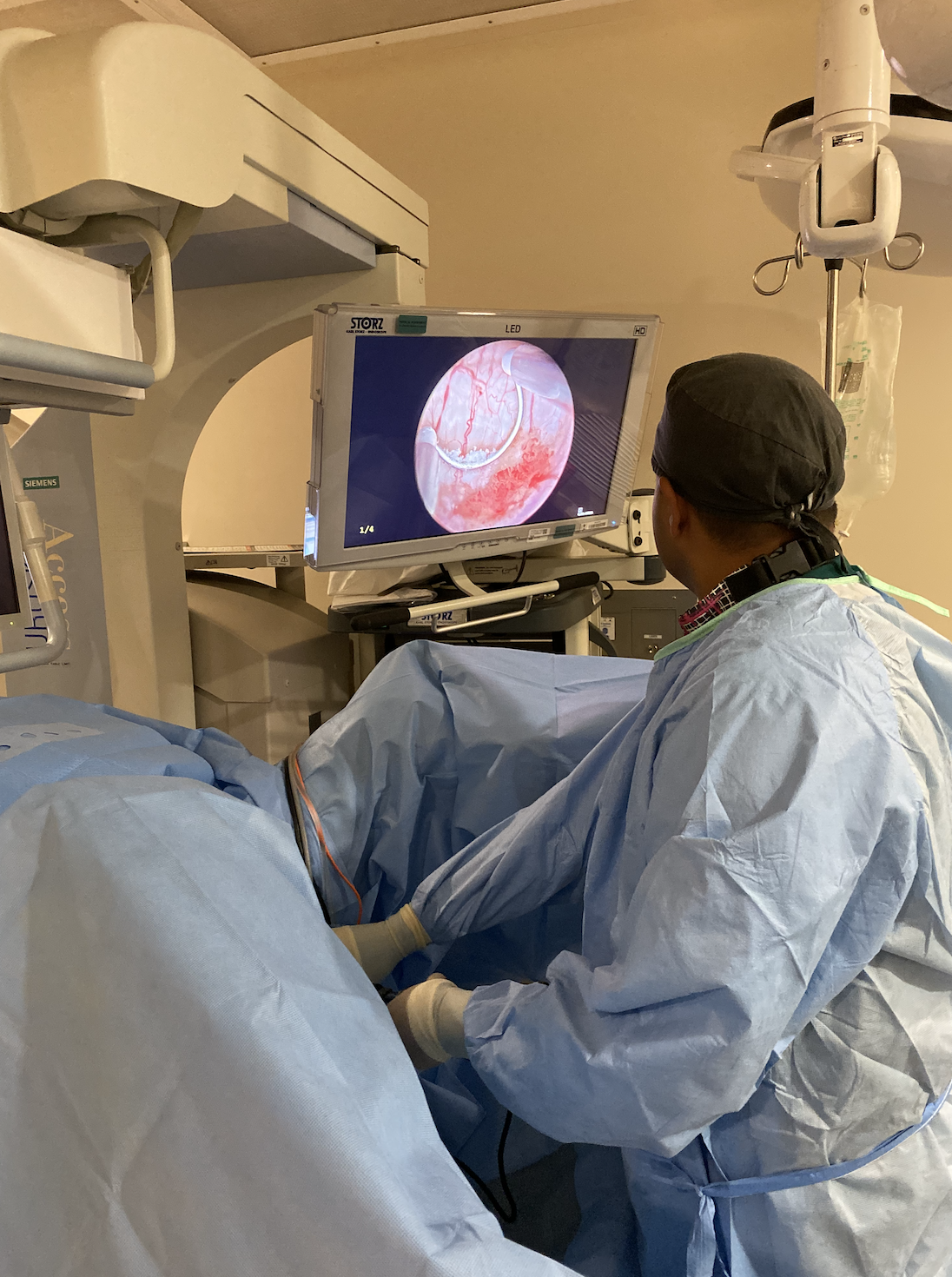
- Urologist performing a TURBT

Occupation
- Occupation type: Specialty
- Activity sectors: Medicine, surgery

Description
- Education required: Doctor of Medicine; Doctor of Osteopathic Medicine; Bachelor of Medicine, Bachelor of Surgery
- Fields of employment: Hospitals, clinics

Urology (from Greek οὖρον ouron "urine" and -λογία -logia "study of"), also known as genitourinary surgery, is the branch of medicine that focuses on surgical and medical diseases of the urinary system and the male reproductive organs. Organs under the domain of urology include the kidneys, adrenal glands, ureters, urinary bladder, urethra, and the male reproductive organs (testes, epididymides, vasa deferentia, seminal vesicles, prostate, and penis).

The urinary and reproductive tracts are closely linked, and disorders of one often affect the other. Thus a major spectrum of the conditions managed in urology exists under the domain of genitourinary disorders. Urology combines the management of medical (i.e., non-surgical) conditions, such as urinary-tract infections and benign prostatic hyperplasia, with the management of surgical conditions such as bladder or prostate cancer, kidney stones, congenital abnormalities, traumatic injury, and stress incontinence.

Urological techniques include minimally invasive robotic and laparoscopic surgery, laser-assisted surgeries, and other scope-guided procedures. Urologists receive training in open and minimally invasive surgical techniques, employing real-time ultrasound guidance, fiber-optic endoscopic equipment, and various lasers in the treatment of multiple benign and malignant conditions. Urology is closely related to (and urologists often collaborate with the practitioners of) oncology, nephrology, gynaecology, andrology, pediatric surgery, colorectal surgery, gastroenterology, and endocrinology.

Urology is a surgical specialty for physicians, with new urologists being less than 1.5% of United States medical-school graduates each year.

Urologists are physicians which have specialized in the field after completing their general degree in medicine. Upon successful completion of a residency program, many urologists choose to undergo further advanced training in a subspecialty area of expertise through a fellowship lasting an additional 12 to 36 months. Subspecialties may include: urologic surgery, urologic oncology and urologic oncological surgery, endourology and endourologic surgery, urogynecology and urogynecologic surgery, reconstructive urologic surgery (a form of reconstructive surgery), minimally-invasive urologic surgery, pediatric urology and pediatric urologic surgery (including adolescent urology, the treatment of premature or delayed puberty, and the treatment of congenital urological syndromes, malformations, and deformations), transplant urology (the field of transplant medicine and surgery concerned with transplantation of organs such as the kidneys, bladder tissue, ureters, and, recently, penises), voiding dysfunction, paruresis, neurourology, and androurology and sexual medicine. Additionally, some urologists supplement their fellowships with a master's degree (2–3 years) or with a Ph.D. (4–6 years) in related topics to prepare them for academic as well as focused clinical employment.

== Training ==
=== United States ===
As of 2022, there are 146 residency programs that offered 356 categorical positions. Urology is one of the early match programs, with results given to applicants by early February (6 weeks before NRMP match). Applications are accepted starting Sep 1, with some programs accepting applications until early Jan.

It is a relatively competitive specialty to match into, with only 65.6% of US seniors matching in the 2022 match cycle. The number of positions has grown from 278 in 2012 to 356 in 2022. Matching is significantly more difficult for IMGs and students who have a year or more off before residency - match rates were 27% and 55% respectively in 2012.

The medical school environment may also be a factor. A study in 2012 also showed after an analysis of match rates from schools between 2005 and 2009 that 20 schools sent more than 15 students into urology (1 standard deviation above the median), with Northwestern University sending 44 students over those five years.

After urology residency, there are seven subspecialties recognized by the AUA (American Urological Association):

- Oncology
- Calculi
- Female Urology
- Infertility
- Pediatrics
- Transplant (renal)
- Neurourology

=== Australia ===
Training is completed through the Royal Australasian College of Surgeons (RACS). The program requires six years of full-time training (for those who commenced prior to 2016), or five years for those who commenced after 2016. The program is accredited by the Australian Medical Council.

=== Nepal ===
In Nepal, the formal urologist degree awarded is MCh (Magister Chirurgiae). This is a three years course post masters and includes thesis and a mandatory publication. This degree is awarded after completing MBBS (four and half year plus a one-year rotatory internship) and MS (Mastery of surgery) in general surgery (three years course). Till now two universities Tribhuvan University and Kathmandu University as well as two Autonomous institutes BP Koirala Institute of health sciences and National Academy of Medical Sciences (Bir Hospital) run the MCh Urology programme. This degree is equivalent to Clinical PhD and called as "Chikitsa Bidhyabaridhi" by Tribhuvan University (Government University) and is considered to be the highest degree among the surgical discipline degrees.

=== Ethiopia ===
In Ethiopia, in 2001, there were only five qualified urologists. All trained abroad, in countries like India, Tanzania and Hungary. Before this chapter all urology cases were managed by general surgeons. The only urological unit in the country was at Tikur Anbessa Tertiary Hospital. The services provided included ESWL and endo-urology. The urology training program was started in 2009 with a curriculum for general surgeons which had a three-year training program. Up to 2019, six urologists have graduated by this program for general surgeons. The first residency program started accepting general practitioners in 2010 for a five-year program. The first two years were trainings in general surgery, the next three years were dedicated urology training program, which included the same three-year training as of the general surgeons three year curriculum. It started with two residents who graduated in 2015 with a certificate in specialty of urology. Up to 2019, seventeen urologists have graduated from this five-year residency program. From the start these programs in 2009 up to 2019, a total of 23 urologists have been trained in Tikur Anbessa Tertiary Hospital. As of 2020, there were 26 trainees in the programme. All of the urologists who graduated from Tikur Anbessa Tertiary Hospital were as of 2020 working in different parts of the country.

== Subdisciplines ==
As a medical discipline that involves the care of many organs and physiological systems, urology can be broken down into several subdisciplines. At many larger academic centers and university hospitals that excel in patient care and clinical research, urologists often specialize in a particular sub discipline.

=== Endourology ===
Endourology is the branch of urology that deals with the closed manipulation of the urinary tract. It has evolved to encompass a broad range of minimally invasive and endoscopic urologic procedures. As opposed to open surgery, endourology is performed using small cameras and instruments inserted into the urinary tract. Transurethral surgery has long been a cornerstone of endourology as most of the urinary tract can be accessed via the urethra, enabling prostate surgery, surgery of tumors of the urothelium, stone surgery, and simple urethral and ureteral procedures. The addition of laparoscopy and robotic surgery has further subdivided this branch of urology.

=== Laparoscopy ===
Laparoscopy is a rapidly evolving branch of urology and has replaced some open surgical procedures.

=== Robotic surgery ===
Robotic surgery of the prostate, kidney, and ureter has been expanding this field. Today, many prostatectomies in the United States are carried out by robotic assistance. This has created controversy, however, as robotics greatly increase the cost of surgery and the benefit for the patient may or may not be proportional to the extra cost. Moreover, current (2011) market situation for robotic equipment is a de facto monopoly of one publicly held corporation which further fuels the cost-effectiveness controversy.

=== Urologic oncology ===
Urologic oncology is the branch of medicine that focuses on the surgical treatment of malignant genitourinary diseases. This includes cancers of the prostate, adrenal glands, bladder, kidneys, ureters, testicles, and penis, as well as the skin, subcutaneous tissue, muscle, and fascia of these areas, a domain that partially overlaps with dermatologic oncology and related oncology subspecialties. Management of genitourinary cancers may be handled by a urologist or an oncologist, depending on whether the treatment is surgical or medical. In Western countries, most urologic oncologists employ minimally invasive techniques, such as laparoscopy, endourology, or robotic-assisted surgery, to treat cancers that are suitable for surgical intervention.

=== Neurourology ===
Neurourology concerns nervous system control of the genitourinary system, and of conditions causing abnormal urination. Neurological diseases and disorders such as a stroke, multiple sclerosis, Parkinson's disease, and spinal cord injury can disrupt the lower urinary tract and result in conditions such as urinary incontinence, detrusor overactivity, urinary retention, and detrusor sphincter dyssynergia. Urodynamic studies play an important diagnostic role in neurourology. Therapy for nervous system disorders includes clean intermittent self-catheterization of the bladder, anticholinergic drugs, injection of Botulinum toxin into the bladder wall and advanced and less commonly used therapies such as sacral neuromodulation. Less marked neurological abnormalities can cause urological disorders as well—for example, abnormalities of the sensory nervous system are thought by many researchers to play a role in disorders of painful or frequent urination (e.g. painful bladder syndrome also known as interstitial cystitis).

=== Pediatric urology ===
Pediatric urology concerns urologic disorders in children. Such disorders include cryptorchidism (undescended testes), congenital abnormalities of the genitourinary tract, enuresis, underdeveloped genitalia (due to delayed growth or delayed puberty, often an endocrinological problem), and vesicoureteral reflux.

=== Andrology ===
Andrology is the medical specialty focused on male health, particularly conditions affecting the male reproductive system and urological problems that are unique to men, such as prostate cancer, male fertility problems, and surgery of the male reproductive system. It is the counterpart to gynaecology, which addresses female-specific medical issues, especially those related to reproductive and urologic health.

=== Reconstructive urology ===
Reconstructive urology is a highly specialized branch of male urology focused on restoring both the structure and function of the genitourinary tract. Reconstructive procedures may be required following prostate surgeries, full or partial hysterectomies, trauma (such as automobile accidents, gunshot wounds, industrial accidents, or straddle injuries), disease, obstructions, or blockages like urethral strictures, and occasionally even childbirth. Areas commonly addressed in reconstructive urology include the urinary bladder, ureters (the tubes connecting the kidneys to the bladder), and the genitalia, among others, depending on the nature and extent of the injury or condition.

=== Female urology ===
Female urology is a branch of urology dealing with overactive bladder, pelvic organ prolapse, and urinary incontinence. Many of these physicians also practice neurourology and reconstructive urology as mentioned above. Female urologists complete a 1–3-year fellowship after completion of a 5–6-year urology residency. Thorough knowledge of the female pelvic floor together with intimate understanding of the physiology and pathology of voiding are necessary to diagnose and treat these disorders. Depending on the cause of the individual problem, a medical or surgical treatment can be the solution. Their field of practice heavily overlaps with that of urogynecologists, physicians in a sub-discipline of gynecology, who have done a three-year fellowship after a four-year OBGYN residency.

== Journals and organizations ==
There are a number of peer-reviewed journals and organizations associated with urology, see Category: Urology journals ad Category:Urology organizations.

== List of urological topics ==
- Benign prostatic hyperplasia
- Bladder cancer
- Bladder stones
- Cystitis
- Development of the urinary and reproductive organs
- Epididymitis
- Erectile dysfunction
- Hard flaccid syndrome
- Interstitial cystitis
- Kidney cancer
- Kidney stone
- Kidney transplant
- Peyronie's disease
- Postorgasmic illness syndrome
- Prostate cancer
- Prostatitis
- Replantation
- Retrograde pyelogram
- Retrograde ureteral
- Testicular cancer
- Vasectomy
- Vasectomy reversal
