= Zenker =

Zenker is the name of:

- Friedrich Albert von Zenker (1825–1898) was a German pathologist, who named:
  - Zenker's degeneration
  - Zenker's diverticulum
  - Zenker's fixative
  - Zenker's paralysis
- Georg August Zenker (1855–1922), German gardener and naturalist
- Hans Zenker (1870–1932), German admiral
- Jonathan Carl Zenker (1799–1837), German naturalist
- Karl-Adolf Zenker (1907–1998) was a German admiral and son of Hans Zenker
- Christian Zenker (1975), German tenor
- Helmut Zenker (1949–2003), from Austria
- Ramon Zenker, German music producer
- Rudolf Zenker (1903–1984), heart surgeon
- Wolfgang Zenker, (1898–1918), German military officer
