= Male genital examination =

Medical examination

- Test of: Male genitals

Human male reproductive system

Male genital examination refers to the physical examination of male genitalia to detect ailments and assess sexual development; it is a typical component of an annual physical examination. The examination includes checking the penis, scrotum, and urethral meatus. A comprehensive assessment of the male genitals assesses the pubic hair based on Tanner stage and the size of the testicles and penis. The exam can also be conducted to verify a person's age and biological sex. During a genital examination, doctors can detect structural abnormalities (ex. varicocele), urethral opening abnormalities, foreskin abnormalities (ex. phimosis), lumps, tumors, redness, excoriation, edema, lesions, swelling, cancer, pubic hair related conditions, and many others. In some instances (ex: Peyronie's disease) where a physical examination of the male genitals is not sufficient to diagnose an individual, an internal genital examination using imaging or ultrasounds will be needed for further evaluation.

== Procedure ==
During a male genital examination, a doctor will carefully inspect and check the palpation of the scrotum and penis. The exposure of the groin and genital area with adequate lighting is required. The ideal position is with the professional sitting in front of the examinee. The examination may take place with the individual sitting or laying face upward, but to investigate possible varicocele and hernia it is necessary that the person is standing in front of the examiner.

== External examination ==
Examination of the external genitalia include an inspection and palpation of the penis, scrotum, and urethral meatus.

According to the American College Health Association (ACHA) guidelines for Best Practices for Sensitive Exams, it is required to explain all expectations of the examination to the examinee prior to start.

- The external genital examination begins with the undressed examinee standing in front of the seated professional. The examiner visually scans the distribution of pubic hair and appearance of the external genital. Examiner notes presence of large masses, undescended testicles or bulges in groin region.
- For individuals with an uncircumcised penis, the foreskin is pulled back to expose the glans. Examiner palpates the shaft of penis and inspect for unusual firmness. In addition, examiner should note any ulcers or plaques present during palpation.
- Examiner slightly pulls opening of urethra using their thumb to expose the mucosa for inspection of lesions. If discharge is present in the urethral opening, cultures are collected to further assess for sexually transmitted infections.
- Return foreskin to normal position.
- Palpate scrotum to examine the appearance, size and position of the testicles. The normal shape of testicle is oval and smooth but tender to the touch. Examiner will note if testicle can be separated from epididymis.
- Examine for masses in the scrotum by using a light source in a dark room to shine through region. If there is a solid tumor present, light will not be able to shine through. If there is a hydrocele, light that shines through will present itself as a red color.
- Palpate abdominal region to determine if testicle is undescended.
- Palpate the spermatic cord and note the connection to the testicle. In some instances, examiner will perform the Valsalva maneuver to assess the mass on the veins within the spermatic cord.
- Palpate the inguinal canals to assess for hernias or abnormal tenderness.
- Examination is repeated with the examinee in supine position.

An external examination may possibly detect structural abnormalities but may require exploratory surgery to determine diagnosis.

== Testicular self-examination ==
Testicular self-examination (TSE) is performed to detect changes and symptoms that can indicate sexually transmitted infections (STI) or a more harmful disease. Testicular self-examinations only take a few minutes and should be done every four weeks. Testicular cancer is most common in males between the age 20–34 years old, and can appear as soon as the age of 15 years old. It is important to start TSE at a young age, to detect any possible signs for testicular cancer.

A testicular self-examination can be performed in front of a mirror to view the entire surface. To properly examine the scrotum, it should be warm and relaxed. Each testicle should be inspected by rolling it between the thumb and fingers, covering the entire surface. It is normal for one testicle to be larger than the other. During the examination an individual is searching for the appearance of any swelling, tenderness, bumps or blisters. It is important to reach out to a doctor if any abnormalities or new lumps are found.

== Structural abnormalities ==
Benign (not cancerous) mass may be present in scrotum and detected through palpation. These may include epididymal cysts, spermatocele, hydrocele, varicocele, epididymitis. Ultrasounds for a mass growth may be ordered by a doctor for differentiation between spermatocele, varicocele, and epididymal cysts.

- Spermatocele is sperm accumulation in the epididymis. Spermatoceles are benign cysts, that are generally pain free. Some individuals may experience symptoms associated with the spermatoceles such as dull pain or heaviness in the scrotum. While this can be detected during the annual physical exam, a person can also check for it with a self-exam and should notify a health care provider if it greatly increases in size or firmness. If the size or pain become bothersome, there are treatment option available. Treatments include: medications to reduce pain and/or swelling; aspiration and sclerotherapy (minimally invasive therapies that are rarely recommended or used); spermatocelectomy (a surgical approach). Surgical/ invasive treatments may lead to fertility problems. Post treatment procedure may include wearing a pressure dressing, addressing swelling with ice packs, and taking medication for pain.
- Hydrocele is swelling from fluid collection in the sac surrounding the testicles. It can typically be found in male infants, but can also develop in boys during puberty as well as adults.
- Varicoceles are the swelling of the veins inside the scrotum typically on the left side. These masses may appear or feel similar to a "bag of worms". Usually varicoceles do not cause harm or pain, however, they can sometimes result in pain, infertility, or issues related to testicular growth. Normally, a group of veins known as pampiniform plexus cool the blood traveling to the testicles, allowing for them to remain at a temperature cooler than the core body heat. In varicoceles, these veins become enlarged, which disrupts the cooling process leading to less properly functioning sperm being produced. They can also lead to less testosterone being produced. Treatments are typically not used due to the harmless nature of varicoceles. However, treatments are available for individuals experiencing pain/discomfort, fertility problems, "symptoms of low testosterone levels", and unusual results from semen analysis. Treatments include medication to address pain, surgery (microscopic and laparoscopic varicocelectomy), and embolization. The goal of surgery and embolization is to hinder blood flow to the enlarged veins.
- Epididymitis is the inflammation (swelling) of the tube connecting testicle and vas deferens. When the testis becomes swollen, in addition to the epididymis, this is called epididymo-orchitis. Epididymitis can be acute (lasting less than six weeks) or chronic (lasting equal to or more than six weeks). Pain experienced due to chronic epididymitis is usually more dull compared to acute epididymitis and can be intermittent. Typically, this condition is caused by a bacterial infection including a urinary tract infection or a sexually transmitted disease (such as chlamydia and gonorrhea). It can also be caused by: enlargement or infection of the prostate gland; blockage in the urethra (tube that carries urine out of the body); tuberculosis; amiodarone. Diagnosis may involve testing urine samples or an ultrasound. Treatment can include antibiotics, medications to address pain and swelling, or surgical removal of the epididymis.
- Epididymal cysts is a mass that forms in the epididymis. These cysts differ from spermatoceles as they contain clear fluid, rather than seminal fluid. In addition, spermatoceles are more likely to be found on the head of the epididymis.

Other abnormalities can be detected during male genital examination including Peyronie's disease. Peyronie's disease is caused by an injury or an autoimmune disease that results in plaque build up under the skin of the penis. A lot of build up of this plaque will cause a curvature to the penis and can cause pain during erection. It is more common in males over the age 40 years old.

Male genital exam screening can detect early signs, or indication of cancers that include penile cancer and testicular cancer. Penile cancer is due to trapped fluids under the foreskin of the penis. Uncircumcised individuals have a higher risk of penile cancer. Symptoms that may indicate penile cancer during male examination include lumps on the penis, swelling, and skin around the penis becoming thicker. Penile cancer and its grade is diagnosed by a biopsy to confirm. Testicular cancer is when malignant cells grow in the tissues of the testicles. Males are at higher risk of testicular cancer between the age of 15-35 years old. Testicular cancer signs include swelling and fluid build up in the scrotum. Other signs can be pain, and any new lumps in the testicles. Testicular cancer is confirmed by CT scans or an X-ray.

== Genitourinary abnormalities ==
During the assessment of the genitourinary system, the doctor can detect any of the following: dysuria, foul smelling urine, hematuria, urethral discharge, discomfort, sexually transmitted disease, urinary tract infection, and many others. The assessment may include social history, family history (ex: congenital anomalies), sexual behaviors and habits.

== Pediatric genital abnormalities ==
As part of pediatric medical evaluations, a comprehensive examination of the male genitalia plays a crucial role in identifying and addressing a range of genital abnormalities that can affect young boys. This examination seeks to determine the presence of any dysmorphic features and assess the general health of the baby. Pediatric genital abnormalities encompass a diverse array of conditions that can arise during early development, affecting the sexual and reproductive organs of children. Among the most common anomalies are hypospadias, epispadias, chordee, ambiguous genitalia, undescended testicles, inguinal hernias, and hydroceles. Each of these conditions presents distinct challenges and may require specialized medical attention and surgical intervention. From atypical urethral placements and curvatures of the penis to ambiguous sexual characteristics and fluid accumulations, these conditions can impact a child's overall health and well-being. Early detection and timely management are crucial to achieving optimal outcomes and ensuring a healthy future for affected children. To address these complexities, multidisciplinary teams comprising pediatric urologists, surgical specialists, endocrinologists, geneticists, and neonatal care physicians collaborate to develop personalized treatment plans and deliver comprehensive care. This section explores these genital abnormalities and briefly introduces each of them.

=== Hypospadias ===
The second-most frequently encountered genital abnormality in children is known as hypospadias which is present in 1 out of 250 children at birth. This condition is characterized by an atypical placement of the urethral opening, which is situated not at the usual location on the tip of the penis but rather positioned further down on the ventral surface, between the junction of the penile shaft and the scrotum. Alongside this anatomical variation, affected children often exhibit a condition called chordee, wherein the penis presents a curvature pointing downward towards the scrotum.

=== Epispadias ===
Epispadias is a congenital condition that is evident from birth. In this condition, the urethra, which serves as the passage for urine from the bladder out of the body, does not fully develop into a complete tube, leading to challenges in the process of urination. Additionally, 90% of children with epispadias often exhibit a co-occurring condition called bladder exstrophy. Early diagnosis and timely management of epispadias are crucial to achieve optimal results and minimize potential complications. A multidisciplinary approach involving pediatric urologists and surgical specialists is essential to provide personalized treatment plans and comprehensive care for children born with this condition.

=== Chordee ===
Chordee refers to a curvature of the penis, a condition that can be present from birth. Some children may have chordee without any accompanying hypospadias or epispadias. Fortunately, this condition can often be effectively corrected through outpatient procedures involving surgical resection and the placement of placating sutures in the penis. Early detection and timely treatment of chordee contribute to more favorable outcomes, and regular follow-up with healthcare professionals ensures proper healing and successful resolution of the condition. The collaborative effort between pediatric urologists and surgical specialists plays a crucial role in providing tailored treatment plans and delivering comprehensive care for children dealing with chordee.

=== Ambiguous genitalia ===
Ambiguous genitalia can manifest as a result of various factors, such as abnormal chromosomes, gonadal complications, or enzymatic disorders. Throughout development, both male and female external genitalia originate from shared fundamental structures. As a consequence, children with XY genes may exhibit female genitalia, while those with XX genes may display male genitalia, leading to ambiguity in their sexual characteristics. During the comprehensive physical examination, it is crucial to assess for any dysmorphic features and evaluate the overall health of the baby. Infants with XY DSD (Disorders of Sex Development) may exhibit a higher likelihood of being small for gestational age and might present with other associated developmental anomalies. Consequently, a thorough evaluation is essential to identify and address any potential health concerns or distinctive physical characteristics that may be present in affected infants.

=== Undescended testicles ===
Undescended testicles represent one of the most frequently encountered conditions in newborns. For example, a study shows that undescended testicles affects approximately 4.8 percent of all Malaysian male newborns. During normal development, testes form in the retroperitoneum, the back part of the abdomen, and subsequently descend through the inguinal canal into the scrotum. Diagnosing undescended testicles involves a physical examination. If the testis cannot be felt, it is categorized as "non-palpable." Generally, there are three underlying reasons for nonpalpable testicles:

1. The testis is in the inguinal canal but cannot be palpated for specific reasons.
2. The testis is situated inside the abdomen.
3. The testis does not exist on that side altogether.

In the majority of cases, testicles descend into the scrotum within the first year of a boy's life. However, if this descent does not occur during the initial year, surgical correction is recommended to prevent potential damage to the testis, as it functions optimally and grows best in the scrotal position. When the testis cannot be palpated, laparoscopy is performed to determine the underlying cause. Laparoscopy alone is often effective in moving intra-abdominal testes into the scrotum. The correction of cryptorchidism (undescended testicles) is associated with improved fertility potential, approaching that of the general population.

=== Inguinal hernias ===
Inguinal hernias are a common occurrence in young children. Unlike hernias in adults, these hernias involve the failure of the peritoneum, the sac that encloses the intestines, to close properly, resulting in an opening between the abdomen and scrotum. Detecting an inguinal hernia is typically characterized by a noticeable bulge in the groin or scrotum, which may vary in size. Hernias can emerge as strangulated hernia (an emergency situation) or reducible hernia (a less urgent condition).

=== Hydrocele ===
Hydroceles result from an accumulation of fluid along the membrane covering the front and sides of the testicle. The accumulation can be indicator of tumors, infection, etc. Fortunately, treating hydroceles is a straightforward process that involves closing the opening with an outpatient procedure. This effective intervention leads to a minimal recurrence rate, ensuring successful outcomes for the majority of cases.

== Other purposes ==
This examination serves various purposes, including the detection of conditions such as testicular cancer, Klinefelter syndrome, and urinary issues. Clinicians use the male genital examination as an opportunity to promote sexual/reproductive health (SRH) among young males and provide education on male anatomy, function, and SRH-related matters.

== See also ==
- Pelvic examination - female genital examination
