= Pharyngeal pouch =

Pharyngeal pouch may refer to:

- Zenker's diverticulum
- Pharyngeal pouch (embryology)
