= Sperm sac =

Sperm sac may refer to:

- Spermatophore, a mass of spermatozoa, a sperm sac passed between reproductive partners.
- Spermatheca, an organ in females that stores sperm for later use, the sperm sac.
- Milt, sperm sacs, large sacs containing large amounts of matured sperm.
- Epididymis, a part of the extended testes region that stores sperm, the sperm sac.
  - Spermatocele, a deformation of the epididymis, as sacs of fluid and sperm, sperm sacs.
- Seminal vesicle, a gland for seminal fluid, also called the sperm sac.
  - sperm sac, a blind-end pouch of the seminal vesicle.
- Testes, testicles; glands that produce sperm, sperm sacs.
- Scrotum, a sac which holds the testes.
