= West Virginia Senate Bill 456 =

2025 West Virginia law

West Virginia Legislature
- Long title: A BILL to amend the Code of West Virginia, 1931, as amended, by adding a new article, designated §5-32-1, §5-32-2, §5-32-3, §5-32-4, §5-32-5, §5-32-6, §5-32-7, and §5-32-8, relating to clarifying definitions of sex, male, and female in state law; and providing for related protections for single-sex spaces.
- Territorial extent: West Virginia
- Passed by: West Virginia Senate
- Passed: March 11, 2025
- Enacted: March 11, 2025
- Enacted by: West Virginia House of Delegates
- Enacted: March 11, 2025
- Signed by: Patrick Morrisey
- Signed: March 12, 2025

Legislative history

Initiating chamber: West Virginia Senate
- Bill title: Senate Bill 456
- Introduced: February 13, 2025
- First reading: February 27, 2025
- Second reading: February 28, 2025
- Third reading: March 3, 2025
- Voting summary: 32 voted for; 1 voted against; 1 absent

Revising chamber: West Virginia House of Delegates
- First reading: March 4, 2025
- Second reading: March 6, 2025
- Third reading: March 11, 2025
- Voting summary: 90 voted for; 8 voted against; 2 absent

Final stages
- Finally passed both chambers: March 11, 2025
- Status: In force

West Virginia Senate Bill 456 (SB 456), also known as the Riley Gaines Act or Stand with Women Legislation, is a 2025 law in the state of West Virginia that modifies the definitions of man, woman, and sex in state law, thereby restricting access to certain sex-designated spaces. It was signed into law by Governor Patrick Morrisey on March 12, 2025 after passing the legislature the previous day. It took effect on July 9, 2025.

The law affects transgender West Virginians, particularly trans women. The law is named after Riley Gaines, a conservative activist who opposes transgender girls in girls' sports and facilities.

== Provisions ==
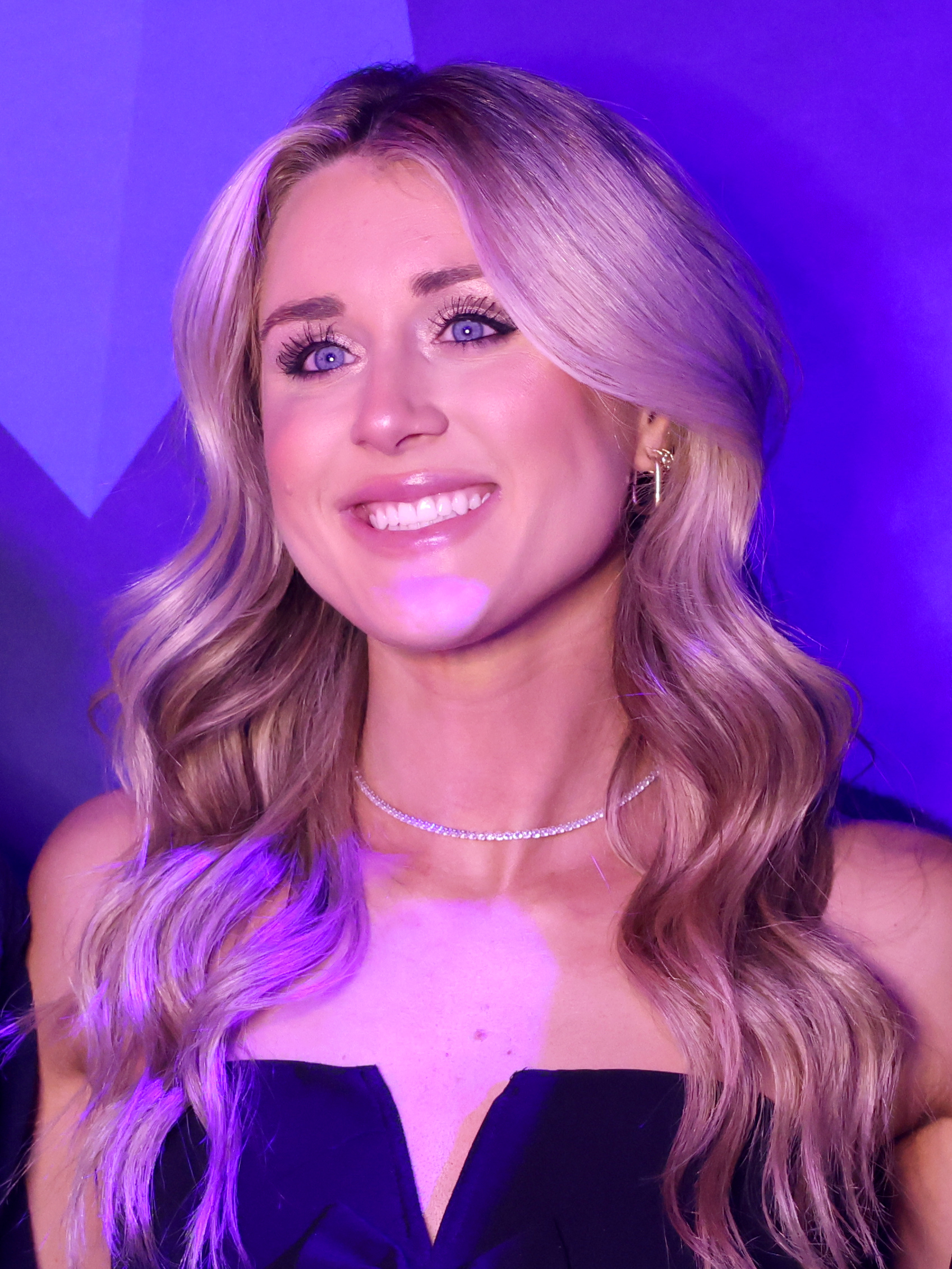
Riley Gaines, the namesake of the Riley Gaines Act. She was present during the signing of SB 456.

SB 456 defines certain gender and sex-related terms in state law, such as male, female, and sex, among others. More specifically, it ties those definitions to that of biological sex. An amendment was included so the law could not be used to perform "genital examinations" so as to determine the sex of minors.

== Reactions ==
=== Support ===
SB 456 is supported by the Alliance Defending Freedom. Patrick Morrisey, who signed the bill into law, claimed it would help fight "radical gender ideology".

=== Opposition ===
The only member of the West Virginia Senate to vote against SB 456, Joey Garcia, opposed the bill because of statements of other West Virginians who were or would be harmed by the bill.

== See also ==
- LGBTQ rights in West Virginia
