= Zenk =

Zenk is a surname. Notable people with the surname include:

- Colleen Zenk (born 1953), American actress
- Hans-Joachim Zenk (born 1952), German sprinter
- Tom Zenk (born 1958), American professional wrestler and bodybuilder

== See also ==
- Menk (surname)
- Zenke
