= Killian–Jamieson diverticulum =

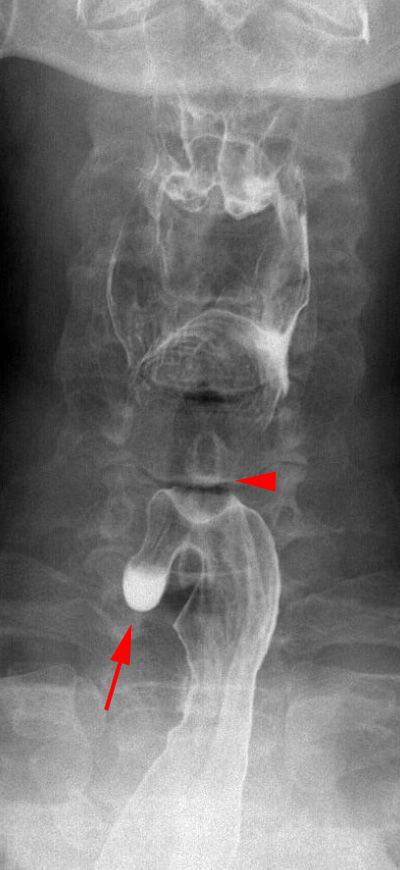
- Killian–Jamieson diverticulum. The arrowhead points at the closed upper esophageal sphincter, arrow points at the diverticulum partly filled with contrast medium.
- Specialty: Gastroenterology

A Killian–Jamieson diverticulum is an outpouching of the esophagus just below the upper esophageal sphincter.

The physicians that first discovered the diverticulum were Gustav Killian and James Jamieson. Diverticula are seldom larger than 1.5 cm, and are less frequent than the similar Zenker's diverticula. As opposed to a Zenker's, which is typically a posterior and inferior outpouching from the esophagus, a Killian–Jamieson diverticulum is typically an anterolateral outpouching at the level of the C5-C6 vertebral bodies, due to a congenital weakness in the cervical esophagus between the oblique and transverse fibers of the cricopharyngeus muscle. It is usually smaller in size than a Zenker's diverticulum, and typically asymptomatic. Although congenital, it is more commonly seen in elderly patients.

Because of its relatively anterior positioning compared to a Zenker's diverticulum, surgical intervention to fix a Killian-Jamieson diverticulum has a higher risk of injury to the recurrent laryngeal nerve.

== Signs and symptoms ==
When it comes to Killian-Jamieson diverticulum, the vast majority of patients are asymptomatic. Dysphagia is the most common presentation for patients. Additional recurrent symptoms include aspiration, halitosis, coughing, globus sensation, and neck pain.

== Causes ==
It's still unknown what causes Killian-Jamieson diverticulum. Numerous theories have been put forth. A notable rise in intraluminal pressure was hypothesized by one author as a result of functional outflow obstruction brought on by the circular esophageal muscle contracting. A different author proposed that there may be a similar pathophysiology between the etiology of Killian-Jamieson diverticulum and Zenker's diverticula.

== Diagnosis ==
Imaging usually confirms the diagnosis because a barium esophagram can show the location, size, and lateralization of the lesion. Although there are other modalities such as esophageal endoscopy, CT scan, and ultrasound, most clinicians rely on barium esophagram to make clinical decisions.

== Treatment ==
Expectant management makes sense for asymptomatic patients. Patients experiencing symptoms can have a variety of surgical options available to them, such as transcervical diverticulectomy combined with esophagomyotomy.

== See also ==
- Zenker's diverticulum
- Diverticulum
