= Rete tubular ectasia =

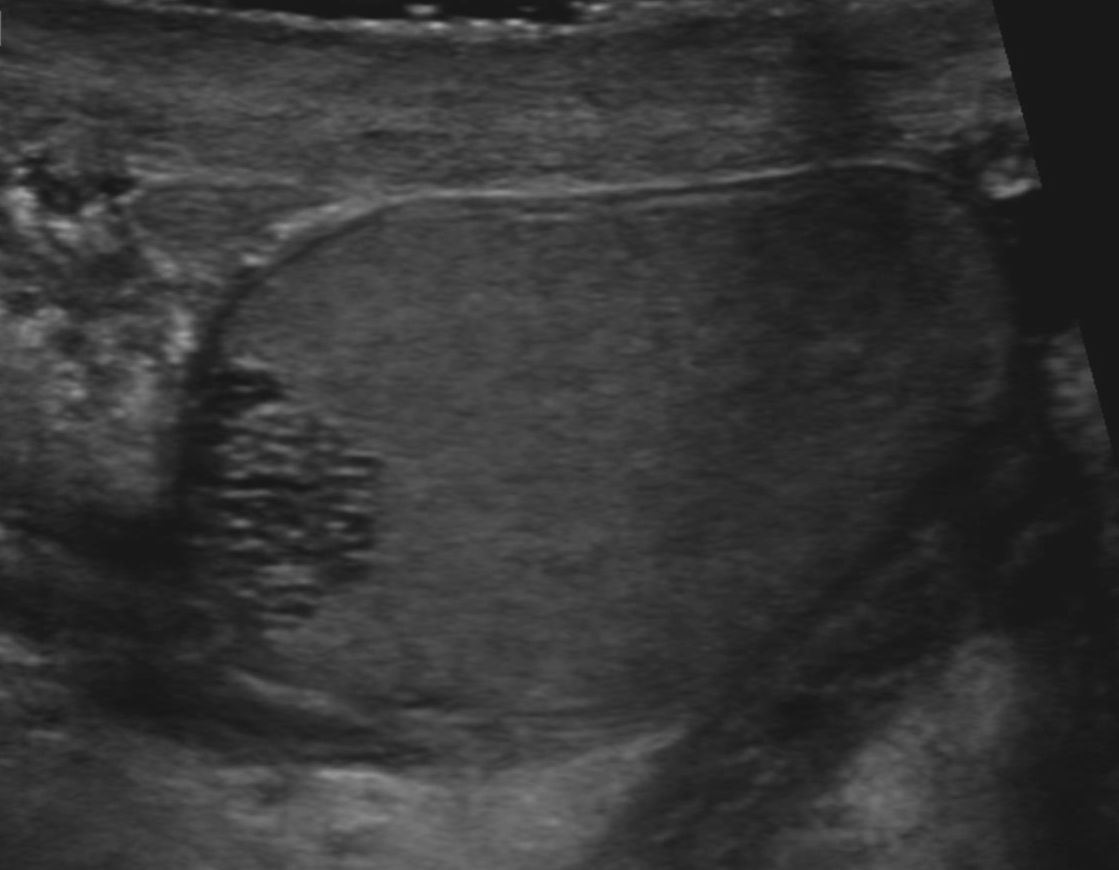
Ultrasound image showing tubular ectasia of the rete testis as an incidental finding in an 81 year old male

Rete tubular ectasia, also known as cystic transformation of rete testis is a benign condition, usually found in older men, involving numerous small, tubular cystic structures within the rete testis.

== Presentation ==
It is usually found in men older than 55 years and is frequently found on bilateral testes but is often asymmetrical.

== Mechanism ==
The formation of cysts in the rete testis is associated with the obstruction of the efferent ducts, which connect the rete testis with the head of the epididymis. They are often bilateral.

== Diagnosis ==
The condition can be detected with ultrasonography. Cystic lesions us usually found at the mediastinum testis with elongated shaped lesions displacing the mediastinum. It is commonly associated with epididymal abnormalities, such as spermatocele, epididymal cyst, and epididymitis. The condition shares a common location with cystic dysplasia of the testis and intratesticular cysts. Unlike cystic neoplasms, they don't present specific tumor markers. Another distinguishing feature is that tubular ectasia of the testes is confined only to the mediastinum, unlike testicular cancer such as cystic teratoma of the testis which spreads throughout the testis.

== Treatment ==
Typically none is required, but they can be treated surgically if symptomatic.

== Additional images ==
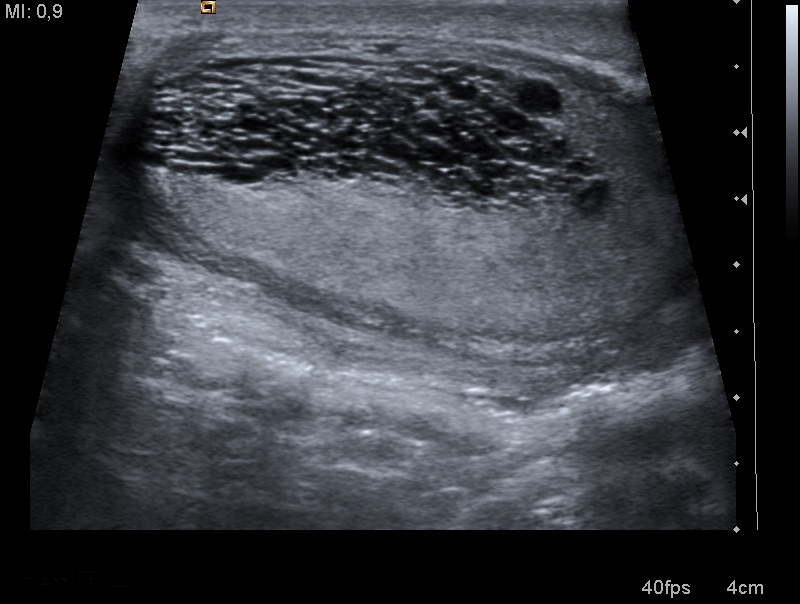
Tubular ectasia of the rete testis

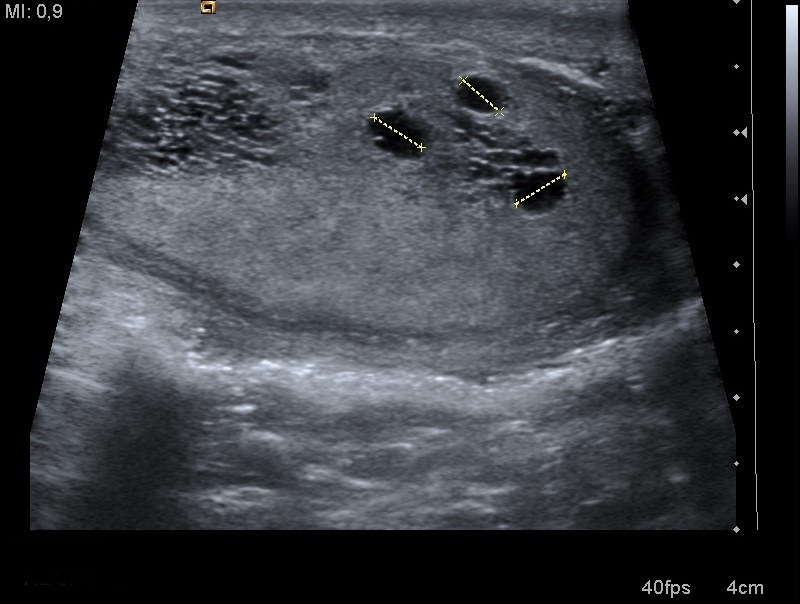
Tubular ectasia of the rete testis

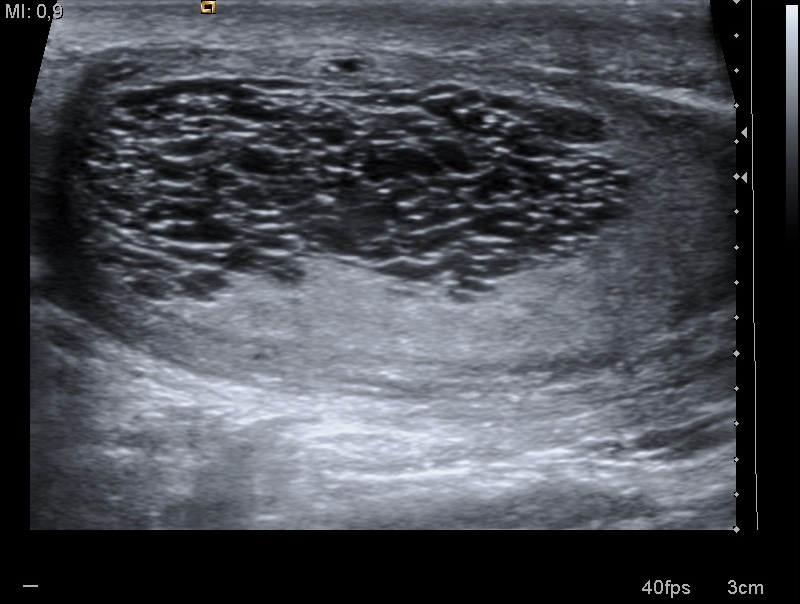
Tubular ectasia of the rete testis
