= Diverticulum =

Outpouching of a structure in the body

- Other names: Diverticula
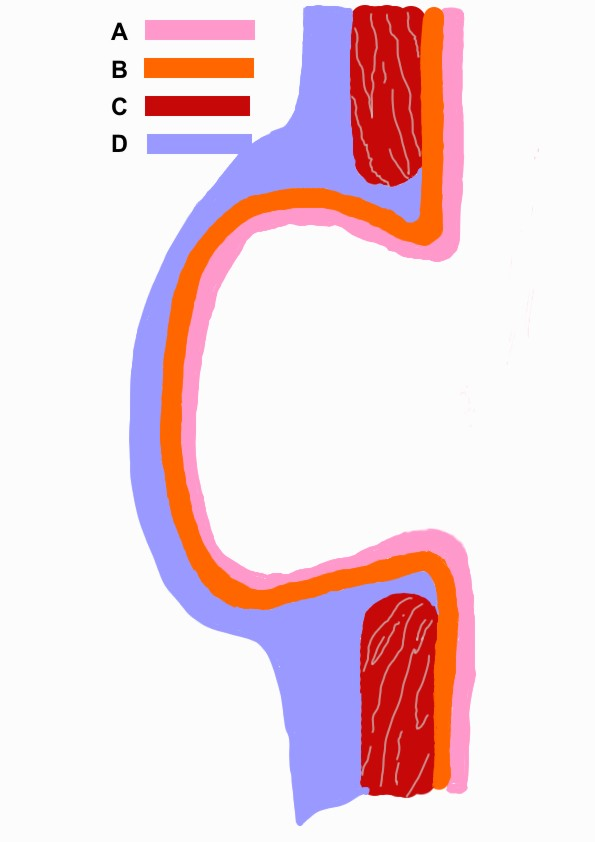
- Schematic drawing of a false diverticulum. A - mucosa; B - submucosa; C - muscularis; D - serosa and subserosa
- Specialty: Gastroenterology

In medicine or biology, a diverticulum is an outpouching of a hollow (or a fluid-filled) structure in the body. Depending upon which layers of the structure are involved, diverticula are described as being either true or false.

In medicine, the term usually implies the structure is not normally present, but in embryology, the term is used for some normal structures arising from others, as for instance the thyroid diverticulum, which arises from the tongue.

The word comes from Latin dīverticulum, "bypath" or "byway".

== Classification ==
Diverticula are described as being true or false depending upon the layers involved:

- False diverticula (also known as "pseudodiverticula") do not involve muscular layers or adventitia. False diverticula, in the gastrointestinal tract for instance, involve only the submucosa and mucosa, such as Zenker's diverticulum. False diverticula are typically synonymous with pulsion diverticula, which describes the mechanism of formation as increased intraluminal pressure.
- True diverticula involve all layers of the structure, including muscularis propria and adventitia, such as Meckel's diverticulum. True diverticula are typically synonymous with traction diverticula, which describes the mechanism of formation as pulling forces external to the structure.

== Embryology ==
- The kidneys are originally diverticula in the development of the urinary and reproductive organs.
- The lungs are originally diverticula (lung buds) forming off of the ventral foregut.
- The thymus appears in the form of two flask-shape diverticula, which arise from the third branchial pouch (pharyngeal pouch) of the endoderm.
- The thyroid gland develops as a diverticulum arising from a point on the tongue, demarcated as the foramen cecum.

The 3 classifications of esophageal diverticula. 1-Pharyngeal (Zenker's) 2-Midesophageal 3-Epiphrenic

== Human pathology ==
=== Gastrointestinal tract diverticula ===
- Esophageal diverticula may occur in one of three areas of the esophagus:

1. Pharyngeal (Zenker's) diverticula usually occur in the elderly, through Killian's triangle between the thyropharyngeus and cricopharyngeus muscle of the inferior pharyngeal constrictors.
2. Midesophageal diverticula
3. Epiphrenic diverticula are due to dysfunction of the lower esophageal sphincter, as in achalasia.

- A duodenal diverticulum can be found incidentally in 23% of normal people undergoing imaging. It can be either congenital or acquired, but the acquired form is more common and is due to the weakness of the duodenal wall, which causes protrusions. It is usually found at the second or third part of duodenum, around the ampulla of Vater. Food debris may enter the diverticular outpouchings, causing inflammation or diverticulitis. On CT or MRI imaging, it appears as a sac-like outpouching. If the diverticulum is filled with contrast agents, the wall would be thin and may contain air, fluid, contrast material, or food debris. If the food debris is broken down by bacteria, the outpouching may show "faeces sign". Inflammation of the duodenal wall shows thickening of the wall. Rarely, on barium studies in congenital duodenal diverticula, the contrast material fills up the true lumen, causing "windsock" deformity.
- A jejunal diverticulum is a congenital lesion and may be a source of bacterial overgrowth. It may also perforate or result in abscesses.
- A Killian-Jamieson diverticulum is very similar to a pharyngeal esophageal diverticulum, differing in the fact that the pouching is between the oblique and transverse fibers of the cricopharyngeus muscle.
- A Laimer diverticulum is an outpouching that occurs in the Laimer triangle between the cricopharyngeus and superior esophageal circular muscle.
- Colonic diverticula, although found incidentally during colonoscopy, may become infected (see diverticulitis) and can perforate, requiring surgery. These diverticula typically involve only the mucosal and submucosal layers of the colon, without protruding through the third colonic layer. They are typically asymptomatic until diverticular disease develops from inflammation or infection. Diverticulosis (the presence of colonic diverticula) is often present in older individuals, however there are increasing reports of diverticular disease in younger patients. The sigmoid and left colon are the most common locations for colonic diverticula in western countries. The right-sided colon is more commonly affected in Asian populations.
- Gastric diverticula are very infrequent.
- Meckel's diverticulum, a persistent portion of the omphalomesenteric duct, is present in 2% of the population, making it the most common congenital gastrointestinal malformation.

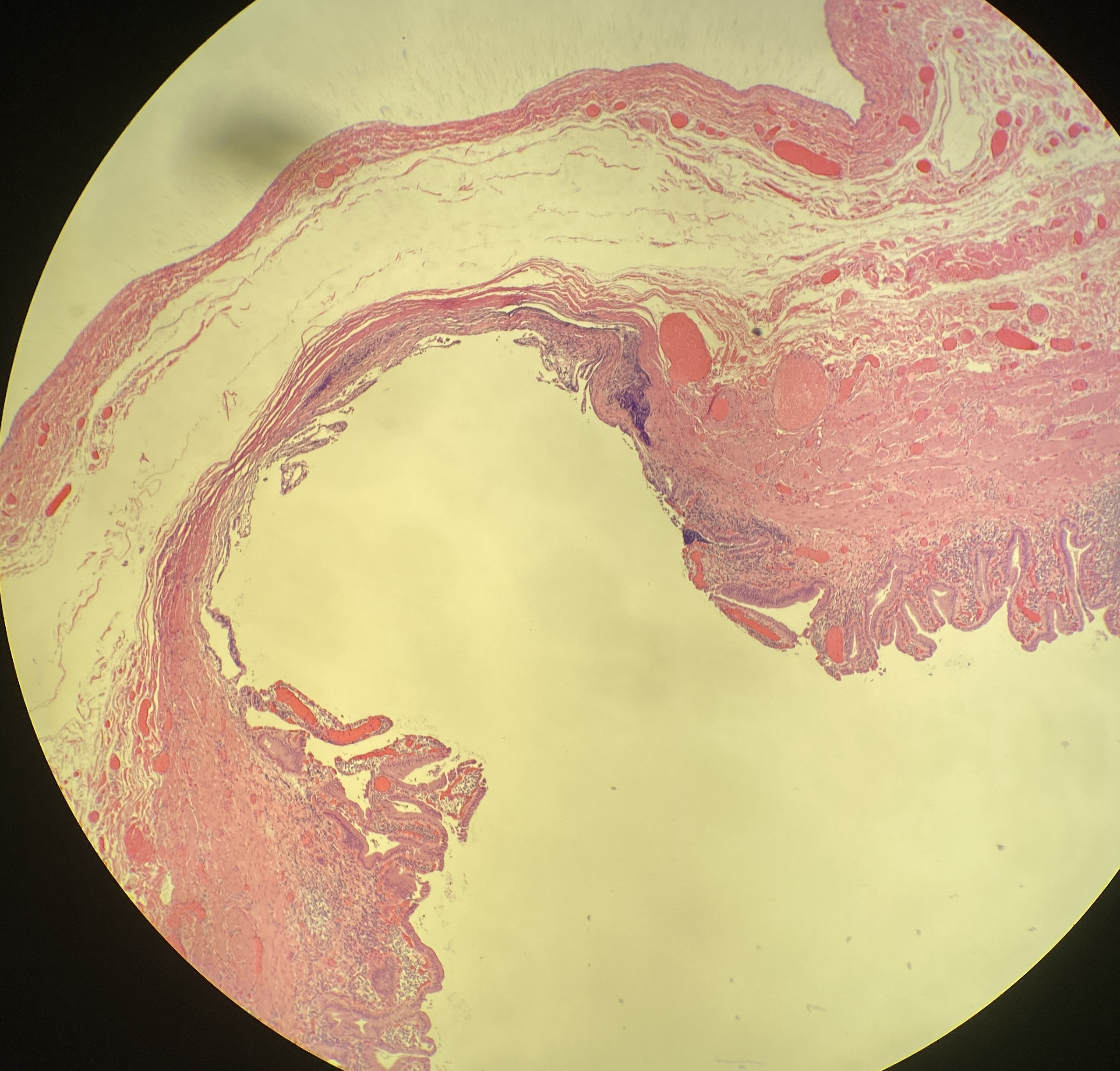
Histopathology of the gallbladder, showing a false diverticulum (larger than a Rokitansky–Aschoff sinus). It is not true, as the muscularis layer is essentially absent over the diverticulum rather than bulging outward.

- Rokitansky-Aschoff sinuses are diverticula in the gallbladder due to chronic cholecystitis

Most of these pathological types of diverticula are capable of harboring an enterolith. If the enterolith stays in place, it may cause no problems, but a large enterolith expelled from a diverticulum into the lumen can cause obstruction.

=== Genito-urinary tract diverticula ===
- Bladder diverticula are balloon-like growths on the bladder commonly associated with chronic outflow obstruction, such as benign prostatic hyperplasia in older males. Usually found in pairs on opposite sides of the bladder, bladder diverticula are often surgically removed to prevent infection, rupture, or even cancer.
- Calyceal diverticula are usually asymptomatic, but if a stone becomes lodged in the outpouching, they may present with pain.For calyceal diverticular calculi, preoperative CT urography findings can be stratified using the L.E.N.S.O. radiological complexity score (location, excretion, neck visibility, stone size, and orientation) to predict stone-free outcomes following flexible ureteroscopy.
- Urethral diverticula are usually found in women aged 30 to 70 years old, in between 1 and 6% of adult women. Since most cases are without any symptoms, the true incidence is unknown. Symptoms may vary from frequent urinary tract infections, painful sexual intercourse (dyspareunia), or symptoms due to cancer. A urethral diverticulum is located on the anterior vaginal wall, 1 to 3 cm inside the vaginal introitus. MRI is preferred as the imaging method of choice due to its excellent soft-tissue resolution. On T2-weighted imaging, it shows a high signal in the diverticulum due to the presence of fluid inside it. Vaginal ultrasonography is highly sensitive in diagnosing the diverticulum, but it is strongly dependent on the skills of the operator.

=== Other diverticula ===
- A diverticulum of Kommerell is an outpouching (aneurysm) of the aorta where an aberrant right subclavian artery is located. It is unusual nomenclature, in that focal dilatations of a blood vessel are properly referred to as aneurysms.
- Cardiac diverticulum is a very rare congenital malformation of the heart that is usually benign.

== Gallery ==
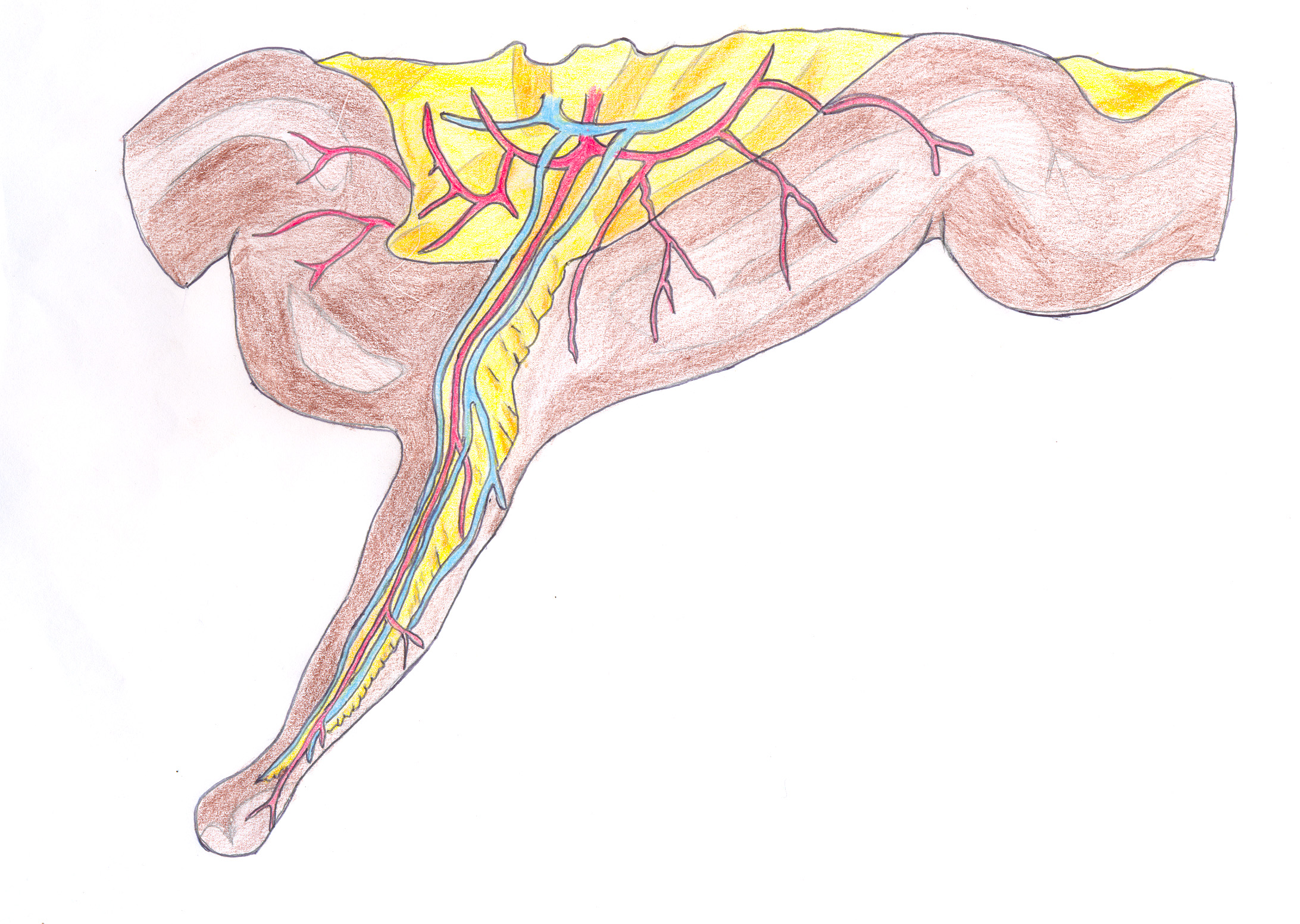
Meckel's diverticulum

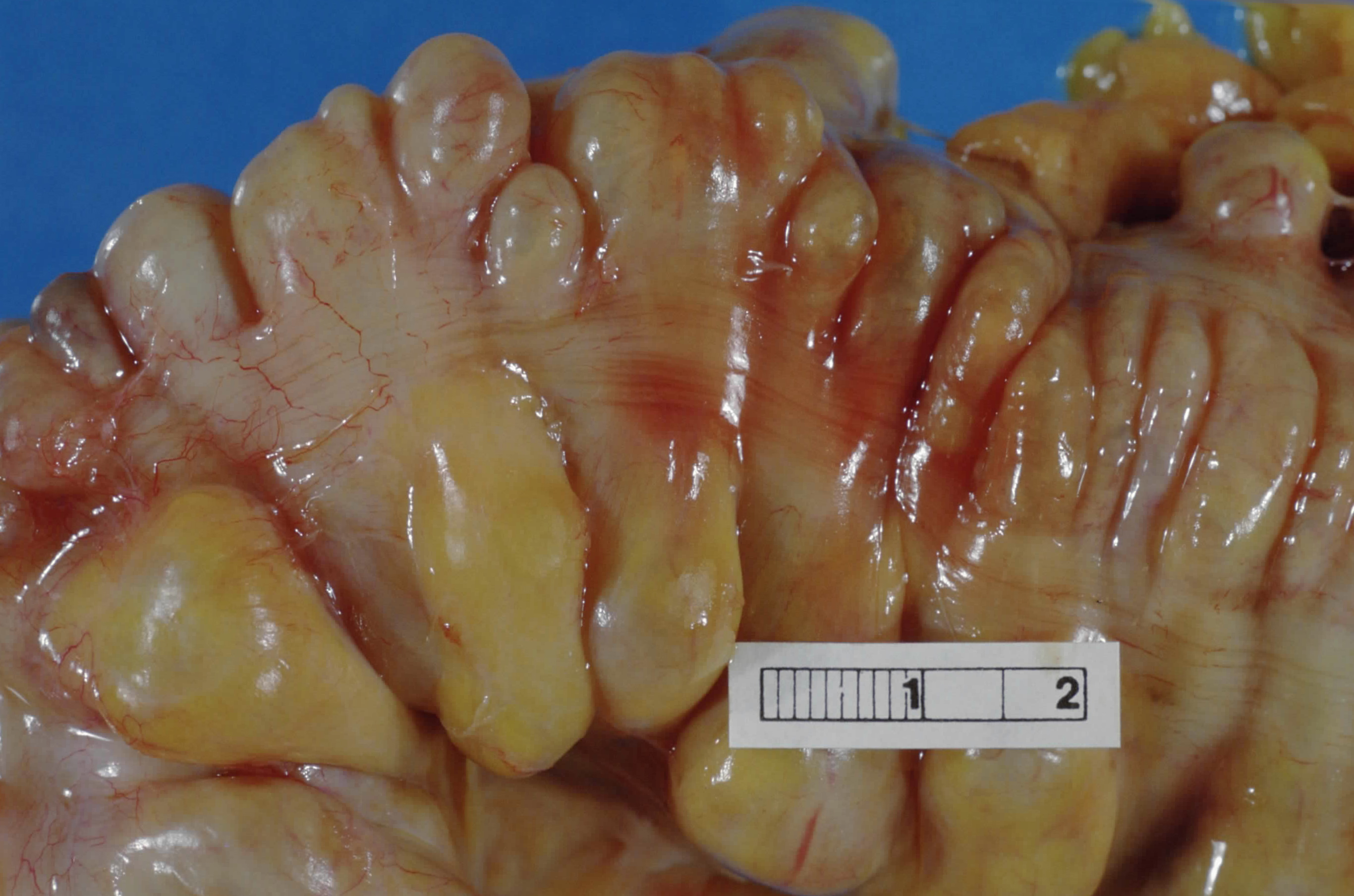
Large bowel (sigmoid colon) showing multiple diverticula: the diverticula appear on either side of the longitudinal muscle bundle (taenium).

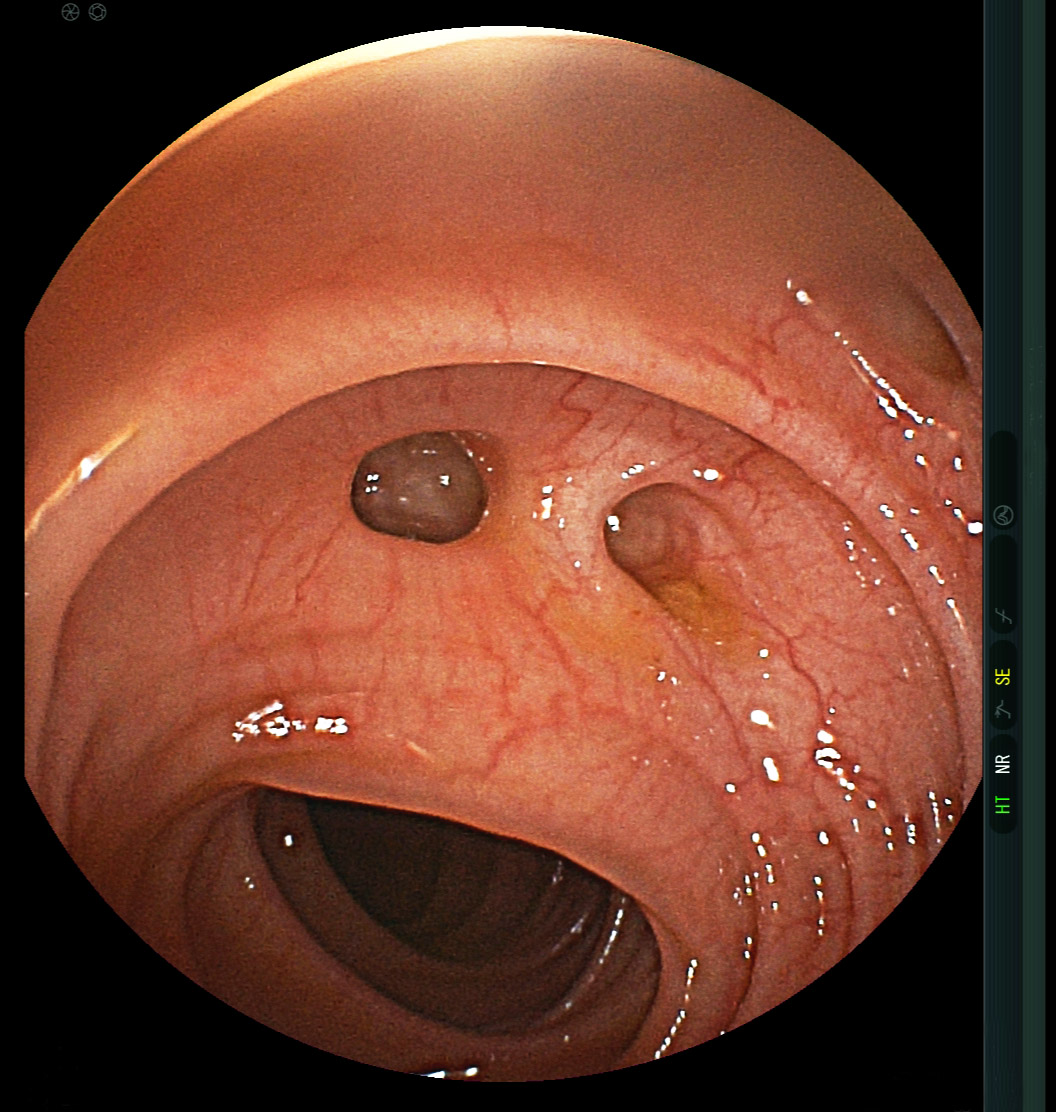
Colonic diverticulum

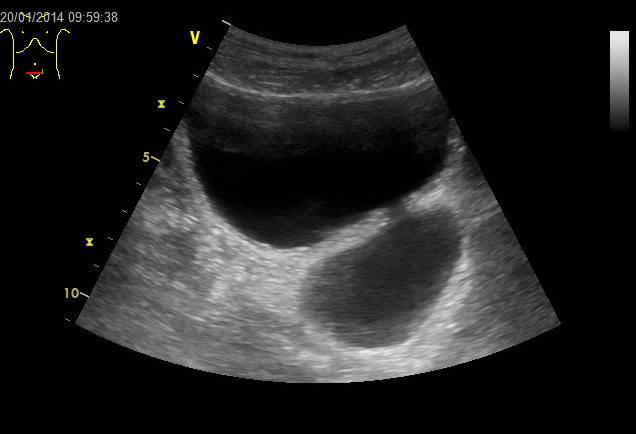
Diverticulum of the urinary bladder of a 59-year-old man, transverse plane

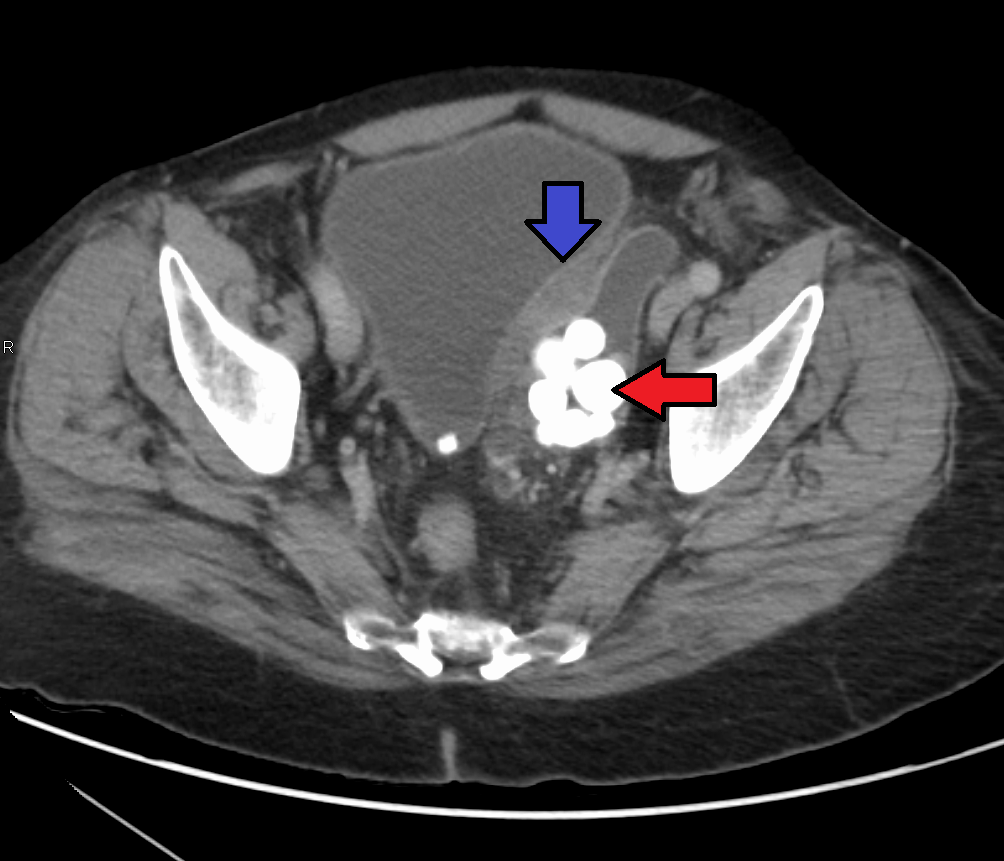
Bladder diverticula containing stones: the bladder wall is thickened due to possible transitional cell carcinoma.

Bladder diverticula as seen on ultrasound with doppler

Bladder diverticula as seen on ultrasound

== See also ==
- Christine Menias
- Skeletal pneumaticity
