= Peroneal nerve paralysis =

- Other names: Peroneal nerve palsy, Zenker’s paralysis
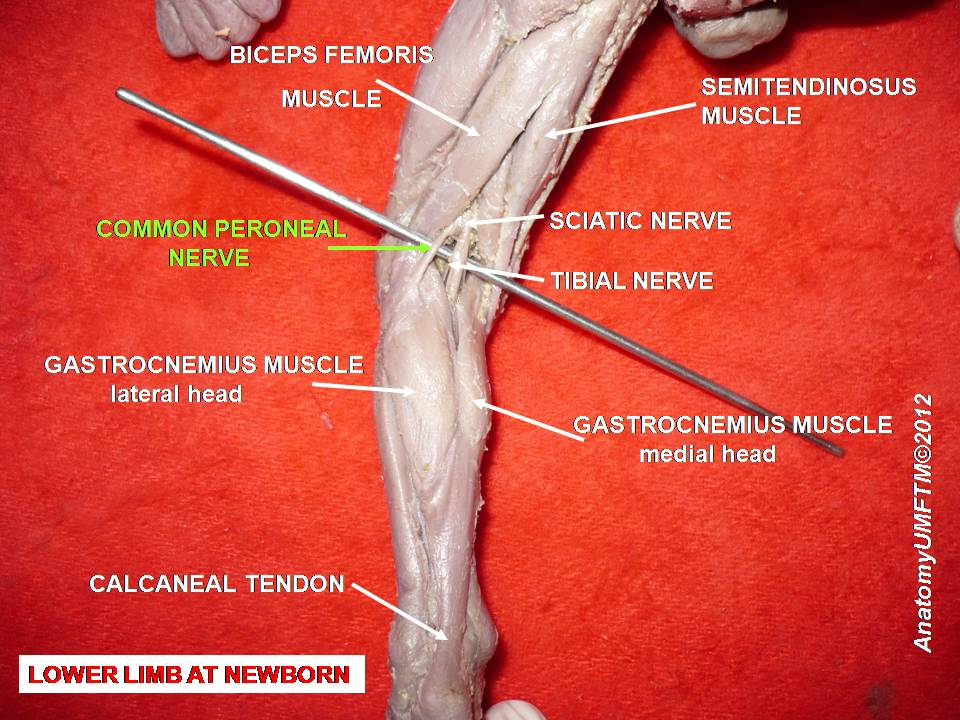
- Location of peroneal nerve on the lower limb
- Specialty: Neurology

Peroneal nerve paralysis is a paralysis on the common fibular nerve that affects the patient’s ability to lift the foot at the ankle. It is also known as Zenker's paralysis, named after Friedrich Albert von Zenker. Peroneal nerve paralysis usually leads to neuromuscular disorder, peroneal nerve injury, or foot drop which can be symptoms of more serious disorders such as nerve compression. The origin of peroneal nerve palsy has been reported to be associated with musculoskeletal injury or isolated nerve traction and compression. Also it has been reported to be mass lesions and metabolic syndromes. Peroneal nerve is most commonly interrupted at the knee and possibly at the joint of hip and ankle. Most studies reported that about 30% of peroneal nerve palsy is followed from knee dislocations.

Peroneal nerve injury occurs when the knee is exposed to various stress. It occurs when the posterolateral corner structure of knee is injured. Relatively tethered location around fibular head, tenuous vascular supply and epineural connective tissues are possible factors that cause damage on the common peroneal nerve. Treatment options for nerve palsy include both operative and non-operative techniques. Initial treatment includes physical therapy and ankle-foot orthosis. Physical therapy mainly focuses on preventing deformation by stretching the posterior ankle capsule. A special brace or splint worn inside the shoe (called an Ankle Foot Orthosis) holds the foot in the best position for walking. Orthosis stretches posterior ankle structures. Physical therapy can help patients to learn how to walk with a foot drop.

== Signs and symptoms ==
Slapping gait makes a slapping noise at the joint of an ankle.

Signs and symptoms of peroneal nerve palsy are related to mostly lower legs and foot which are the following:

- Decreased sensation, numbness, or tingling in the top of the foot or the outer part of the upper or lower leg
- Foot drops (unable to hold the foot straight across)
- Toes drag while walking
- Weakness of the ankles or feet
- Prickling sensation
- Pain in shin
- Pins and needles sensation
- Slapping gait (walking pattern in which each step makes a slapping noise)

Patients may need pain relievers to control pain. Other medications that are used to reduce pain include gabapentin, carbamazepine, or tricyclic antidepressants such as amitriptyline. Whenever if possible, patients need to avoid or limit the use of medication to reduce the risk of side effects. If the pain is severe, a pain specialist can help patients to explore all options to relieve the pain. Physical therapy exercises may help patients to maintain muscle strength. Also, orthopedic devices may improve patient's ability to walk and prevent contractures. Orthopedic devices may include braces, splints, orthopedic shoes, or other equipment. Vocational counseling, occupational therapy, or similar programs may help patients to maximize their mobility and independence.

== Causes ==
Causing factors of peroneal nerve palsy are such as musculoskeletal or peroneal nerve injuries. Usually paralysis occurs at the outside of the leg and the top of the foot. Palsy causes decrease of muscle strength to lift the foot, twist ankle outside, and move toes around. Major cause of palsy is due to dislocation of knee. Other possible causing factors are metabolic dysfunction of lower part of knee or disorientation of hip or pelvis. Damages on peroneal nerves destroy the myelin sheath that covers the axon or the whole nerve cell. There might be a loss of feeling, muscle control, muscle tone, and eventual loss of muscle mass because the nerves aren't stimulating the muscles after they are damaged. Dysfunction of a single nerve such as the common peroneal nerve is called a mononeuropathy. Mononeuropathy means the nerve damage is occurred in one area. However, certain conditions may also cause single nerve injuries.

Common causes of damage to the peroneal nerve include the following:

- Traumatic injury on the knee
- Fracture of the fibula
- Using a tight plaster cast (or other long-term constriction) of the lower leg
- Crossing the legs regularly
- Regularly wearing high boots
- Pressure to the knee from positions during deep sleep or coma
- Long period of resting on bed
- Broken leg bone

Common peroneal nerve injury is more common in people:

- Who are very thin (for example, from anorexia nervosa)
- Who have conditions such as diabetic neuropathy or polyarteritis nodosa
- Who are exposed to certain toxins that can damage the common peroneal nerve

Prolonged pressure on nerve may occur because of:

- Sitting position
- Blood clots, tumors
- Casts on lower leg due to tightness

== Diagnosis ==
For partial nerve palsy, more than 80% of patients will recover completely. For complete nerve palsy, less than 40% of patients will have complete recovery. Peroneal nerve in continuity arises from defined cause will be recovered better than those arise from unknown causes.

Examinations are required for following reasons:

- Considering lumbar radiculopathy during the examination
- Possibility of foot drop
- Sensory loss that may be difficult to determine because of variable and small autonomous zone of sensation
- Tinel's sign over the fibular neck that can help localize the site of nerve compression
- Checking for direct compression that reproduces nerve symptoms

=== Electromyography ===
Electromyography is used to observe peroneal nerve palsy within one month of injuries. And if it is partial peroneal nerve palsy, patients have higher chance to recover fully from the palsy. More than 70 to 80 percent of patients with partial paralysis recovered completely, but those with complete paralysis have chances less than 30 percent to recover completely. If the symptom does not get any better in few months, surgery is required to decompress the nerve.

=== Nerve conduction velocity ===
Nerve conduction velocity is an important aspect of nerve conduction studies. It is the speed at which an electrochemical impulse propagates down a neural pathway. Conduction velocities are affected by a wide array of factors, including age, sex, and various medical conditions. Studies allow for better diagnoses of various neuropathies, especially demyelinating conditions as these conditions result in reduced or non-existent conduction velocities. To perform nerve conduction velocity, surface electrodes are placed onto the skin over nerves at various locations. Each patch sends electrical impulses which stimulate the nerve. Resulting electrical activity of nerve is recorded by the other electrodes. The distance between electrodes and the time it takes for electrical impulses to travel between electrodes are used to determine the velocity of the nerve signals.

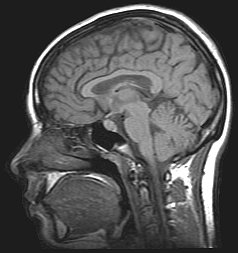
Image of brain MRI.

=== MRI ===
An MRI (magnetic resonance imaging) scan is an imaging test that uses powerful magnets and radio waves to create pictures of the body. It does not use radiation. Single MRI images are called slices. The images can be stored on a computer or printed on film. One exam produces dozens or sometimes hundreds of images. To locate nerve palsy, MRI is used by physicians to detect the position and location of damaged peroneal nerve.

== Prevention ==
Avoid putting long-term pressure on the back or side of the knee. Treat injuries to the leg or knee right away. If a cast, splint, dressing, or other pressure on the lower leg causes a tight feeling or numbness, call the health care provider.

- Avoid crossing legs
- Move around actively and frequently
- Wear knee protections if working on knee
- Alert physician if feeling numbness on leg when casted

== Treatments ==
Precise knowledge about the length and exact localization of a damaged nerve segment is essential for surgical intervention. On one hand, certain preoperative information about the overall state of an injured nerve (state of the neural and perineural tissue) is important because exploratory inspection of a nerve itself may lead to additional inadvertent damage. If, on the other hand, the surgeon, during genicular ligament reconstruction, inspects a nerve at the site of most probable injury only (limited neurolysis), he or she may sometimes by chance expose an unaffected section of a nerve. Because of the mechanism of nerve injury during traction, however, a more proximal or distal segment of the nerve may be severely damaged. A limited nerve inspection without preoperative knowledge about the site of nerve injury may thus give the false impression of an unimpaired nerve and wrongly lead to conservative treatment of the nerve lesion. If no neurologic improvement is shown after 2–3 months from injuries, then operative decompression is indicated. Surgical operations such as grafting and tendon transfer are necessarily required.

=== Tendon transfer ===
Many different conditions can be treated by tendon transfer surgery. Tendon transfer surgery is necessary when a certain muscle function is lost because of a nerve injury. If a nerve is injured and cannot be repaired, then the nerve no longer sends signals to certain muscles. Those muscles are paralyzed and their muscle function is lost. Tendon transfer surgery can be used to attempt to replace that function. Common nerve injuries that are treated with tendon transfer surgery are spinal cord, radial nerve, ulnar nerve, or median nerve injury. Tendon transfers have higher chance to treat nerve palsy, and such transfers include posterior, anterior, and anteroposterior tibial tendon transfer. Peroneal nerve and its nerve branches need to be fixed from adherence to proximal fibula, which proximal fibula is about 3~5 cm.

=== Tendon graft ===
Grafting is a surgical procedure to move tissue from one site to another on the body, or from another person, without bringing its own blood supply with it. Instead, a new blood supply grows in after it is placed. A similar technique where tissue is transferred with the blood supply intact is called a flap. In some instances a grafting can be an artificially manufactured device. Examples of this are a tube to carry blood flow across a defect or from an artery to a vein for use in hemodialysis.

=== Arthroplasty ===
Arthroplasty on knee has been broadly used to treat knee and musculoskeletal joint dislocation. It is an elective procedure that is done to relieve pain and restore function to the joint after damage by arthritis or some other type of trauma. However, there has been series of reports arthroplasty worsens condition of peroneal nerve, causing paralysis. Other forms of arthroplasty include resection (al) arthroplasty, resurfacing arthroplasty, mold arthroplasty, cup arthroplasty, silicone replacement arthroplasty, etc.

== History ==
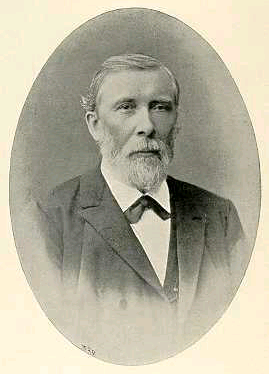
Friedrich Albert von Zenker

Friedrich Albert von Zenker (1825–1898) was a German pathologist and physician, celebrated for his discovery of trichinosis. He was born in Dresden and was educated in Leipzig and Heidelberg. He worked in the city hospital of Dresden in 1851 and became a professor of pathological anatomy and general pathology in the surgico-medical academy of the city. In 1862 he became a professor of pathological anatomy and pharmacology at Erlangen. Three years later he assumed with Ziemssen the editorship of the Deutsches Archiv für klinische Medizin. In 1895 he retired from active service. His important discovery of the danger of trichine dates from 1860. In that year he published "Über die Trichinenkrankheit des Menschen" ("On the trichine-illness of humans", in volume XVIII of Virchow's Archiv). Zenker also found Zenker's degeneration and Zenker's diverticulum.

== See also ==
- Zenker's diverticulum
- Zenker's degeneration
