= Dehiscence =

Dehiscence /dɪˈhɪsəns/ (from the Latin dehisco, meaning to gape, yawn, or split open) can refer to:

- Dehiscence (botany), the spontaneous opening at maturity of a plant structure, such as a fruit, anther, or sporangium, to release its contents
- Wound dehiscence, a previously closed wound reopening
- Superior canal dehiscence, in which a new window opens up in the labyrinth of the inner ear, resulting in a form of vertigo
- Autothysis, a usually fatal, voluntary dehiscence used as a form of defense by ants, termites and other animals.
- Killian's dehiscence, a triangular area in the wall of the pharynx
