= Zenke =

Zenke is a surname. Notable people with the surname include:

- Martin Zenke (born 1953), German biochemist and cell biologist
- Simon Zenke (born 1988), Nigerian footballer
- Thomas Zenke (born 1993), Nigerian footballer

== See also ==
- Zenk
- Zenker
- Zinke
