= LGBTQ rights in West Virginia =

- West Virginia (USA)
- Legal status: Legal since 1976
- Gender identity: Since March 2025, West Virginia only allows recognition of just male and female individuals exclusively under enacted and implemented laws.
- Discrimination protections: Protections in employment; several cities have passed further protections

Family rights
- Recognition of relationships: Same-sex marriage since 2014
- Adoption: Same-sex couples allowed to adopt

Lesbian, gay, bisexual, transgender, and queer (LGBTQ) people in the U.S. state of West Virginia face legal challenges not faced by non-LGBTQ persons. Same-sex sexual activity has been legal since 1976, and same-sex marriage has been recognized since October 2014. West Virginia statutes do not address discrimination on account of sexual orientation or gender identity; however, the U.S. Supreme Court's ruling in Bostock v. Clayton County established that employment discrimination against LGBTQ people is illegal. Since March 2025, West Virginia only allows recognition of just male and female individuals exclusively under enacted and implemented laws.

== Laws against same-sex sexual activity ==
Upon statehood in 1863, West Virginia inherited Virginia's "buggery" law, which provided for one to five years' imprisonment for anal intercourse. Fellatio (oral sex) was not covered by the statute. A bill to extend the law's application to include oral sex, whether heterosexual or homosexual, passed the House of Delegates in 1917, but failed in the Senate. In 1930, the state underwent a comprehensive criminal code revision, which resulted in the elimination of the term "buggery" and the insertion of "crimes against nature", which were defined as homosexual or heterosexual sodomy (anal sex and oral sex), with penalties varying between one and ten years' imprisonment. The law did not distinguish between consensual and non-consensual sodomy, or whether the act had occurred in private or public.

It is unclear how the law was enforced. There are only four recorded sodomy court cases in West Virginia, three of which were overturned by the Supreme Court.

West Virginia repealed its sodomy law in March 1976.

== Recognition of same-sex relationships ==
Same-sex marriage became legal in West Virginia on October 9, 2014, when Attorney General Patrick Morrisey announced he would no longer defend the state's ban on same-sex marriage in court and Governor Earl Ray Tomblin directed all state agencies to comply with recent federal court rulings that established the state's ban was unconstitutional.

A state statute defines marriage as being between a man and a woman. In 2009, a bill that would amend the Constitution of West Virginia to ban same-sex marriage in the state was overwhelmingly voted down (67–30) by the House of Delegates. All 29 House Republicans voted to move the measure out of committee, along with one Democrat. The amendment was heavily supported by Evangelical groups in the state and the Family Council Policy of West Virginia. In 2010, The Marriage Protection Amendment was re-introduced in both the House of Delegates and the Senate. Republican efforts to discharge the measure from the House Constitutional Revision Committee were defeated (68–30), and the amendment was later defeated in the Senate.

In December 2011, Delegate John Doyle introduced a bill to legalize civil unions in West Virginia as one of his last acts before retirement in 2012. It was submitted to the House of Delegates in February 2012 and died without a vote.

West Virginia extended hospital visitation rights to same-sex couples through a designated visitor statute.

=== McGee v. Cole ===
On October 1, 2013, Lambda Legal filed a lawsuit, McGee v. Cole, in U.S. District Court on behalf of three same-sex couples and one of their children challenging the state's denial of marriage licenses to same-sex couples. The suit named two county clerks as defendants. On November 21, West Virginia Attorney General Patrick Morrisey asked the court to allow his office to defend the state's statutes, and on December 19 both he and the clerk asked the court to dismiss part of the suit. On January 30, 2014, the judge assigned to the case, U.S. District Judge Robert C. Chambers, dismissed the part of the suit challenging the state's refusal to recognize same-sex marriages from other jurisdictions, since none of the plaintiffs had married elsewhere, but he invited the plaintiffs to add plaintiffs that had done so and the plaintiffs said they were considering that.

On June 10, 2014, Judge Chambers ordered a stay of proceedings until a ruling in Bostic v. Shaefer, a same-sex marriage case in the Fourth Circuit Court of Appeals. The district judge reasoned that "because of the overlap in the issues present" the Virginia case should be decided first. His order matched those in two other same-sex marriage cases in the Fourth Circuit: Harris v. Rainey, a Virginia case, and Bradacs v. Haley, a South Carolina case.

== Adoption and parenting ==
Married same-sex couples are permitted to adopt, and lesbian couples have access to assisted reproduction services such as in vitro fertilization. State law recognizes the non-genetic, non-gestational mother as a legal parent to a child born via donor insemination, but only if the parents are married. Gestational and traditional surrogacy arrangements are valid and recognized in the state. The state treats different-sex and same-sex couples equally under the same terms and conditions.

== Discrimination protections ==
Map of West Virginia counties and cities that had sexual orientation and/or gender identity anti–employment discrimination ordinances prior to Bostock Sexual orientation and gender identity with anti–employment discrimination ordinance Sexual orientation in public employment Does not protect sexual orientation and gender identity in employment

State statutes do not address discrimination on account of sexual orientation or gender identity. A bill that would have prohibited discrimination based on one's sexual orientation was passed by the state Senate in March 2009, though was killed by the House later that month. In both 2010 and 2011, the bill was re-introduced in the House of Delegates and Senate but stalled in committee. It was re-introduced in the House and Senate in 2013, but again stalled.

The bill was re-introduced in February 2021. It has more Republican co-sponsors than Democratic co-sponsors. The bill heads to the West Virginia House Judiciary Committee.

Several cities have adopted anti-discrimination ordinances, prohibiting unfair discrimination based on sexual orientation and gender identity in the areas of employment, housing and public accommodations. These are Athens, Beckley, Charles Town, Charleston, South Charleston, Fairmont, Harpers Ferry, Huntington, Lewisburg, Martinsburg, Morgantown, Shepherdstown, Sutton, Thurmond and Wheeling. In addition, Kanawha County, Buckhannon, and Elkins have policies banning discrimination based on sexual orientation and gender identity against county/city employees.

=== Bostock v. Clayton County ===
On June 15, 2020, the U.S. Supreme Court ruled in Bostock v. Clayton County, consolidated with Altitude Express, Inc. v. Zarda, and R.G. & G.R. Harris Funeral Homes Inc. v. Equal Employment Opportunity Commission that discrimination in the workplace on the basis of sexual orientation or gender identity is discrimination on the basis of sex, and Title VII therefore protects LGBT employees from discrimination.

=== 2023 religious refusal bill ===
In March 2023, a bill passed the West Virginia Legislature to implement the "religious refusal for businesses and companies" - that legally can refuse to cater to LGBTQ customers as well as qualified immunity to those businesses and companies. The Governor of West Virginia signed the bill into law, effective immediately.

=== Ordinance nullification bill ===
In March 2025, a bill passed the West Virginia Senate by a vote 25-8 to “nullify all city and county ordinances” that for years prevented discrimination against LGBTQ individuals. The bill awaits a vote within the West Virginia House of Delegates.

== Conversion therapy law ==
Statewide there are no conversion therapy laws and bills to ban the practice get introduced, but never get assigned hearings or committee meetings. In July 2021, the judicial committee council within Charleston passed an ordinance - but is awaiting an upcoming procedural final "floor vote". Charleston will become the first city within West Virginia to legally ban conversion therapy. In August 2021, by a floor vote of 14-9 Charleston formally became the first city within West Virginia to legally ban conversion therapy. In October 2021, by a vote of 7-0 Morgantown passed an ordinance to legally ban conversion therapy. The second city within West Virginia to ban the practice after Charleston.

== Gender laws and policies ==
In April 2025, a comprehensive bill passed by both houses of the West Virginia Legislature - will “forcibly make teachers and principals out and expose transgender, non-binary and also intersex students immediately to parents and guardians”. The Governor of West Virginia is yet to either sign or veto the bill.

West Virginia law permits transgender individuals to change the gender marker on their IDs, driver's licenses and birth certificates. The Vital Registration office will issue an updated birth certificate upon receipt of a completed "Birth Certificate Request Form" and a court order for gender change as well as payment of the applicable fees. The Department of Transportation will issue an updated driver's license and ID upon receipt of a completed "Gender Designation Form" signed by a licensed physician. Sex reassignment surgery and sterilization are not official requirements. However, in July 2020, the West Virginia Supreme Court upheld a decision by Wood County Circuit Court rejecting the petitioner to change their gender marker even after completing sexual reassignment surgery.

In March 2025, newly enacted and implemented West Virginia legislation, termed the Riley Gaines Act, does not recognize transgender nor non-binary persons. Before being signed into law by Governor Morrisey, the bill was amended to remove language which would have allowed teachers to examine children's genitals, later restricted to medical professionals, but ultimately deleted altogether after judicial and legal committee controversy and community state outrage.

=== Sports ===
In March 2021, West Virginia passed House Bill 3293, "Relating to single-sex participation in interscholastic athletic events," which restricts transgender athletes from participating on sports teams that "align with their gender identity". House Bill 3293 defines male and female “based solely on the individual’s reproductive biology and genetics at birth”. The Governor of West Virginia Jim Justice signed the bill into law and it went into legal effect on July 1.

The ACLU established a lawsuit to challenge the new law. It was subsequently challenged in Federal Court. In July 2021, a judge did order within West Virginia that a transgender girl join the cross country girls team - despite the new West Virginia law implemented that legally bans transgender individuals in girls sports and athletics.

On January 5, 2023, Federal Judge Joseph Goodwin of the United States District Court, ruled that the bill was constitutional. He upheld the legislation banning transgender individuals within female sports youth teams. In April 2023, the Supreme Court of the United States declined the application formally to the previous case - meaning it fully upholds the lower courts ruling.

West Virginia v. B. P. J. is a pending United States Supreme Court case regarding the issue of transgender athletes. In April 2024, the Fourth Circuit Court of Appeals held that the West Virginia law barring transgender girls and women from participating on girls' and women's sports teams is unconstitutional. In July 2025, the Supreme Court agreed to hear the case.

=== Access to Healthcare ===
In August 2022, a court ruled declared that the 1997 ban on sexual reassignment surgery within West Virginia healthcare Medicaid insurance programs was unconstitutional. Transgender individuals with insurance must by law be given healthcare access to sexual reassignment surgery, effective immediately throughout the state. This was in turn overturned in 2026 by the 4th Circuit, who ruled that "It is not irrational for a legislature to encourage citizens to appreciate their sex and not become disdainful of their sex by refusing ‌to fund experimental procedures that may have the opposite effect"..

In February 2023, there was a hearing in the House of Delegates about whether to bar minors from receiving gender-affirming medical procedures. The bill was formally passed by the West Virginia Legislature in March 2023, banning puberty blockers, hormone therapy, and surgery for transgender minors, except in cases of "severe dysphoria" as diagnosed by at least two physicians. The Governor of West Virginia officially signed the bill into law - goes into effect from January 1, 2024.

On December 9, 2025, Anderson v. Crouch was argued in the U.S. Court of Appeals for the Fourth Circuit. This lawsuit challenged the state Medicaid program's exclusion of gender-affirming care for trans adults.

== Public opinion ==
Recent opinion polls have shown that support for LGBTQ people across the U.S. state of West Virginia is increasing significantly and opposition is decreasing.

A September 2011 Public Policy Polling survey found that 19% of West Virginia voters thought that same-sex marriage should be legal, while 71% thought it should be illegal and 10% were not sure. A separate question on the same survey found that 43% of West Virginia voters supported the legal recognition of same-sex couples, with 17% supporting same-sex marriage, 26% supporting civil unions but not marriage, 54% favoring no legal recognition and 3% not sure.

A September 2013 Public Policy Polling survey found that 23% of West Virginia voters thought that same-sex marriage should be legal, while 70% thought it should be illegal and 7% were not sure. A separate question on the same survey found that 49% of West Virginia voters supported the legal recognition of same-sex couples, with 20% supporting same-sex marriage, 29% supporting civil unions but not marriage, 48% favoring no legal recognition and 4% not sure.

A 2017 Public Religion Research Institute survey showed that 48% of West Virginians supported same-sex marriage, 45% were opposed and 7% were unsure.

A 2022 Public Religion Research Institute poll found that 62% of West Virginia residents supported same-sex marriage, while 38% were opposed and 1% were unsure. The same poll found that 77% supported discrimination protections covering sexual orientation and gender identity. 22% were opposed. Additionally, 63% were against allowing businesses to refuse

Public opinion for LGBTQ anti-discrimination laws in West Virginia
Poll source	Date(s) administered	Sample size	Margin of error	% support	% opposition	% no opinion
Public Religion Research Institute	January 2-December 30, 2019	322	?	64%	28%	8%
Public Religion Research Institute	January 3-December 30, 2018	401	?	63%	30%	7%
Public Religion Research Institute	April 5-December 23, 2017	503	?	61%	29%	10%
Public Religion Research Institute	April 29, 2015-January 7, 2016	640	?	60%	35%	5%

== See also ==
- LGBTQ rights in Virginia
- Politics of West Virginia
- LGBTQ rights in the United States
- Rights and responsibilities of marriages in the United States
