= James Jamieson (Australian doctor) =

Australian doctor (1840–1916)

James Jamieson (5 June 1840 – 1 August 1916) was a Scottish-born Australian medical doctor, president of the Royal Society of Victoria in 1901.

Jamieson was born Beith, Ayrshire, Scotland and educated in Glasgow, awarded MD in 1862. In 1868 he moved to Warrnambool, Victoria, Australia where he set up a practice.

Jamieson moved to Melbourne in 1877 and was honorary physician in the outpatient department of the Melbourne Hospital in 1879–84; he then moved to the Alfred Hospital until his retirement in 1908. He also lectured at the University of Melbourne.

Jamieson published Typhoid Fever in Melbourne in 1887 and Contributions to the Vital Statistics of Australia in 1882. He also contributed to the Medical Journal of Australia (editor 1883–87), Melbourne Review, Victorian Review, Daily Telegraph, The Argus, The Age and Australasian.

The upper esophageal sphincter herniation disorder called Killian-Jamieson Diverticulum is named after him.
