= Hugo Wilhelm von Ziemssen =

German physician (1829–1902)

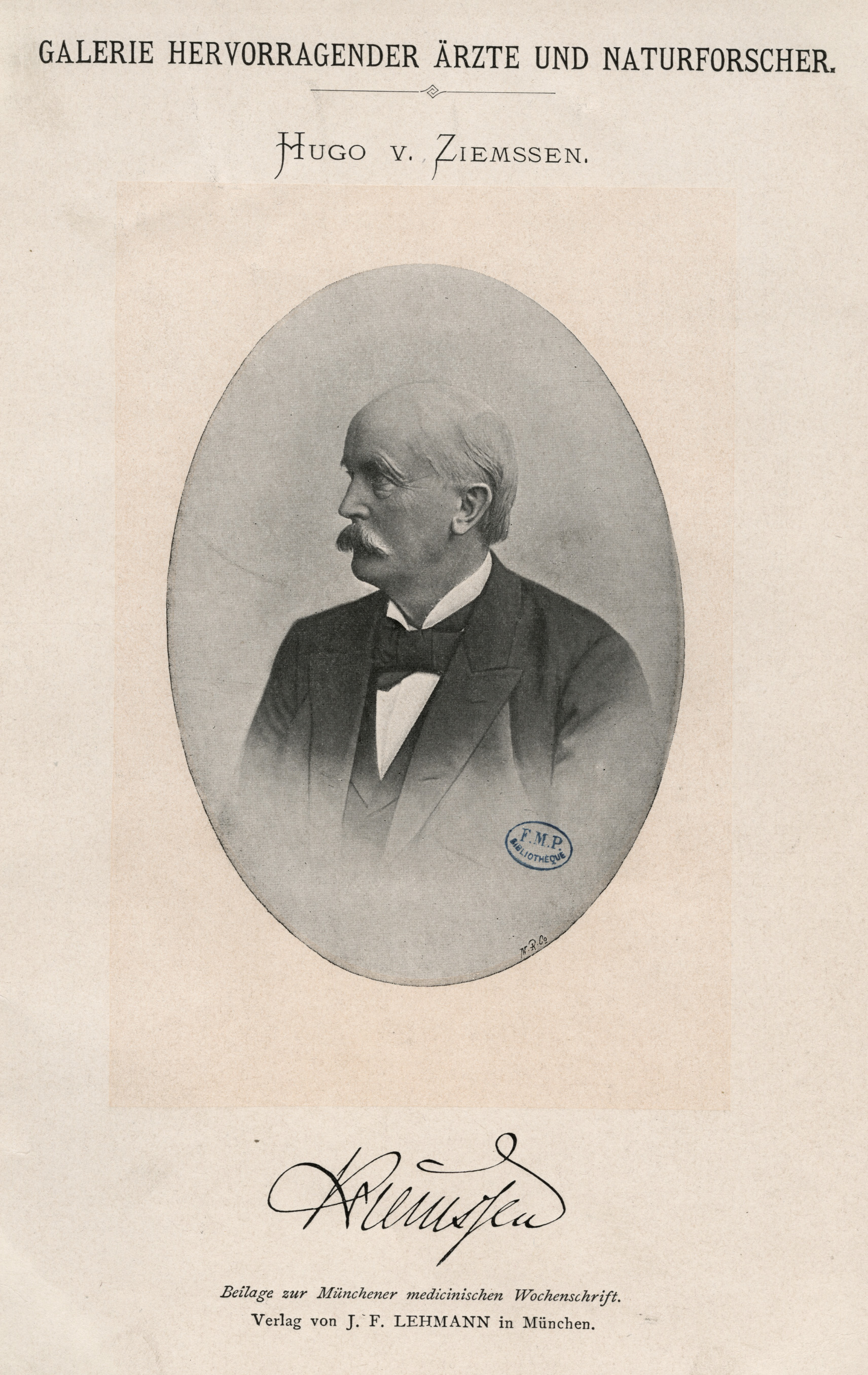
Hugo Wilhelm von Ziemssen

Hugo (Wilhelm) von Ziemssen (13 December 1829 – 21 January 1902) was a German physician, born in Greifswald.

He studied medicine at the universities of Greifswald, Berlin, and Würzburg. In 1863 he was called to the University of Erlangen as a professor of pathology and therapy as well as the director of the medical clinic. In 1874 he relocated to Munich as a professor and director of the general hospital.

He made advances in electrotherapeutics, conducted research on cold-water treatment for typhus and lung inflammation, and became an authority on diseases of the larynx and esophagus.

== Terms ==
- Ziemssen's motor points—the places of entrance of motor nerves into muscles: they are points of election in the therapeutical application of electricity to muscles.
- Ziemssen's treatment—treatment of anemia by subcutaneous injections of defibrinated human blood.

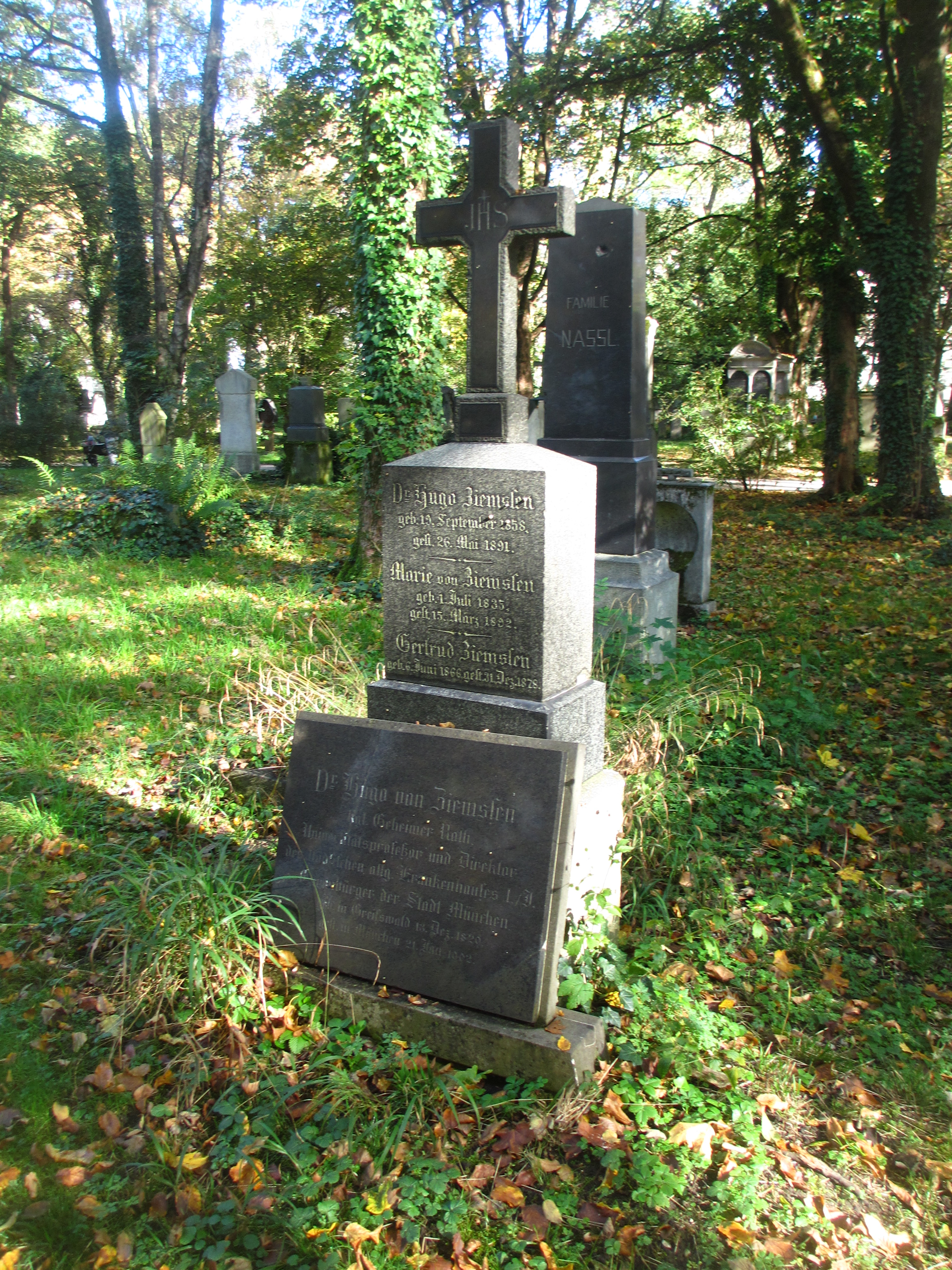
Gravesite of Hugo Ziemssen at Alter Südfriedhof in Munich

== Published works ==
- Pharmacopoea Clinici Erlangensis : kurze Anleitung zur Ordination der wichtigsten Arzneimittel; mit besonderer Rücksicht auf die Armenpraxis; für klinische Praktikanten und angehende Armenärzte zusammengestellt . Besold, Erlangen 2. Aufl. 1874 Digital edition by the University and State Library Düsseldorf

Among other works he published "Klinische Vorträge" (1887–1900). In collaboration with prominent specialists, he published:

- "Handbuch der speciellen Pathologie und Therapie" (1874-1885, 28 volumes); translated into English and published as: "Cyclopaedia of the practice of medicine" (1874–81, 20 volumes); third German edition (16 volumes, 1886–88).
- "Handbuch der allgemeinen Therapie" (four volumes, 1880–84); translated into English and published as: "Handbook of general therapeutics" (1885–87).

From 1865 onwards, with Friedrich Albert von Zenker, he edited the journal "Deutsches Archiv für klinische Medizin".
