= Same-sex marriage in West Virginia =

Same-sex marriage has been legally recognized in West Virginia since October 9, 2014. On July 28, 2014, a ruling by the Fourth Circuit Court of Appeals in Bostic v. Schaefer found Virginia's ban on same-sex marriage unconstitutional. On October 6, the U.S. Supreme Court denied certiorari in Bostic, allowing the ruling to take effect. As a result, on October 9, Governor Earl Ray Tomblin announced he was ordering state agencies to act in compliance with the controlling precedent in the Virginia case. Even though West Virginia's ban had not been explicitly declared unconstitutional, the Fourth Circuit precedent made it certain the state's statutory ban would be overturned. The state started issuing marriage licenses to same-sex couples that same day. The U.S. District Court for the Southern District of West Virginia officially ruled the state's same-sex marriage ban unconstitutional on November 7, 2014 in McGee v. Cole.

Polling suggests that a narrow majority of West Virginia residents support the legal recognition of same-sex marriage. In 2016, a Public Religion Research Institute survey estimated that West Virginia was one of only three U.S. states where a majority of residents were opposed to same-sex marriage; the others being Arkansas and Mississippi. In 2025, the same polling organization estimated that 52% of West Virginians supported same-sex marriage.

== Legal restrictions ==
State statutes define marriage as between "a man and a woman". In 2009, a bill that would have amended the Constitution of West Virginia to ban same-sex marriage was voted down 30–67 by the House of Delegates. All 29 House Republicans voted to move the measure out of committee, along with one Democrat. The amendment was heavily supported by Evangelical groups in the state and the Family Policy Council of West Virginia. In 2010, the Marriage Protection Amendment was re-introduced in both the House of Delegates and the Senate. Republican efforts to discharge the measure from the House Constitutional Revision Committee were defeated by 30 votes to 68. The amendment was later defeated in the Senate. West Virginia's statutory prohibition on same-sex marriage, though unenforceable, remains on the books and has not been explicitly repealed.

In December 2011, Delegate John Doyle introduced a bill to legalize civil unions as one of his last acts before retirement in 2012. It was submitted to the House of Delegates in February 2012, but died without a vote. West Virginia's only recognition of same-sex relationships was its extension of hospital visitation rights to same-sex couples through a designated visitor statute.

== Lawsuit ==
Same-sex marriage in the United States

On October 1, 2013, Lambda Legal filed a lawsuit, McGee v. Cole, in the U.S. District Court for the Southern District of West Virginia on behalf of three same-sex couples and one of their children, challenging the state's denial of marriage licenses to same-sex couples. The suit named two county clerks as defendants. On November 21, Attorney General Patrick Morrisey asked the court to allow his office to defend the state's statutes, and on December 19 both he and the clerks asked the court to dismiss part of the suit. On January 30, 2014, the judge assigned to the case, U.S. District Judge Robert C. Chambers, dismissed the part of the suit challenging the state's refusal to recognize same-sex marriages from other jurisdictions, since none of the plaintiffs had married elsewhere, but he invited the plaintiffs to add couples that had done so and the plaintiffs said they were considering that.

On June 10, 2014, Judge Chambers ordered a stay of proceedings until a ruling in Bostic v. Schaefer, a case in the Fourth Circuit Court of Appeals that challenged Virginia's denial of marriage rights to same-sex couples. The district judge reasoned that "because of the overlap in the issues present" the Virginia case should be decided first. His order paralleled those in two other same-sex marriage cases in the Fourth Circuit's jurisdiction: Harris v. Rainey, another Virginia case, and Bradacs v. Haley, a South Carolina case. Following a decision in favor of same-sex marriage rights in Bostic on July 28, the parties in McGee filed competing motions with the district court on whether to allow the case to proceed. Judge Chambers on September 16 extended the stay pending action by the U.S. Supreme Court. He gave the defendants until October 21 to respond to a motion to rule in the plaintiffs' favor. On October 6, the U.S. Supreme Court refused to hear the appeal of the Bostic ruling from the Fourth Circuit, and the plaintiffs asked the court to rule for them.

Attorney General Morrisey announced on October 9 that he would no longer defend the suit since the U.S. Supreme Court had declined to review Bostic, which had found Virginia's denial of marriage rights to same-sex couples unconstitutional. On October 9, Governor Earl Ray Tomblin announced he was ordering state agencies to act in compliance with the recent decisions of federal courts on the unconstitutionality of same-sex marriage bans. The state started issuing marriage licenses to same-sex couples that same day. Among the first couples to marry were Casie McGee and Sarah Adkins, plaintiffs in McGee, who filed marriage paperwork in Huntington on October 9, and had a marriage ceremony on the steps of the Cabell County Courthouse shortly thereafter. Chris Bostic and David Epp were the first couple to receive a marriage license in Charleston. Judge Chambers ruled on November 7 that the state's denial of marriage rights to same-sex couples was unconstitutional, and in July 2015 ordered the state to pay $92,000 in attorneys' fees to the plaintiff couples. He wrote:

To the extent that West Virginia's interest goes beyond preserving tradition and the institution of marriage, it is still not compelling. The State's laws directly violate the due process and equal protection rights of same-sex couples. The fact that overturning these laws may cause an "abrupt" change does not mean that the laws must not be overturned. Watershed decisions under the equal protection and due process clauses have often brought sudden change. In Loving v. Virginia, for example, the Supreme Court struck down Virginia's anti-miscegenation statute. At the time, sixteen other states had similar laws, and penalties for miscegenation had been "common in Virginia since the colonial period." The Court's decision had the potential to abruptly change the regulation of marriage in Virginia and fifteen other states. Nevertheless, the Court invalidated the law, concluding that it could not stand because "restricting the freedom to marry solely because of racial classifications violates the central meaning of the Equal Protection Clause" and because "[t]he freedom to marry has long been recognized as one of the vital personal rights essential to the orderly pursuit of happiness by free men." Likewise, restricting the freedom to marry based on sexual orientation violates the Equal Protection and Due Process Clauses. That change may come to West Virginia more immediately than the legislature had hoped is not a compelling reason to allow an unconstitutional ban to stand. Moreover, as explained above, West Virginia has already implemented changes to its policy on same-sex marriage and has begun to issue marriage licenses to same-sex couples. It is therefore unlikely that this Court's decision will cause an abrupt change to current state policy. The State's first asserted interest thus cannot survive strict scrutiny.

On June 26, 2015, the U.S. Supreme Court ruled 5–4 in Obergefell v. Hodges that state bans on same-sex marriage violate the Fourteenth Amendment, thus invalidating all remaining state same-sex marriage bans in the United States. Governor Tomblin stated in response, "Since the federal court decision in October 2014, West Virginia has recognized same-sex marriages and state agencies have taken the necessary steps to ensure equal protection. The Supreme Court's ruling confirms those actions, and I continue to encourage all West Virginians, regardless of their personal beliefs, to uphold our state's tradition of treating one another with dignity and respect." Senator Shelley Moore Capito said, "West Virginia's greatest strength is our people. Regardless of our differences, we care for our neighbors, friends and communities in need. Acknowledging that we have differing views, the Supreme Court has made its decision. While I would have preferred that the Supreme Court leave this decision to the states, it is my hope that all West Virginians will move forward and continue to care for and respect one another." Chair of the West Virginia Democratic Party Belinda Biafore called the decision "a monumental step forward for our country", while a spokesperson for the Family Policy Council of West Virginia labelled it "frightening" and expressed concern that owners of public accommodations would be "forced" to provide creative services to same-sex couples, a situation the organisation called "temporary slavery".

== Developments after legalization ==
In 2025, Representative Jeff Eldridge introduced legislation that would have made various definitions in the statutes governing incest gender-neutral. The changes would have ensured that same-sex partners and opposite-sex partners are treated in equal manner with regard to penalties against incest. The bill died in committee.

== Demographics and marriage statistics ==
Data from the 2000 U.S. census showed that 2,916 same-sex couples were living in West Virginia. By 2005, this had increased to 3,423 couples, likely attributed to same-sex couples' growing willingness to disclose their partnerships on government surveys. Same-sex couples lived in all counties of the state, and constituted 0.7% of coupled households and 0.4% of all households in the state. Most couples lived in Kanawha, Cabell and Berkeley counties, but the counties with the highest percentage of same-sex couples were Jefferson (0.74% of all county households) and Morgan (0.62%). Same-sex partners in West Virginia were on average younger than opposite-sex partners, and more likely to be employed. In addition, the average and median household incomes of same-sex couples were higher than different-sex couples, but same-sex couples were far less likely to own a home than opposite-sex partners. 14% of same-sex couples in West Virginia were raising children under the age of 18, with an estimated 713 children living in households headed by same-sex couples in 2005.

310 and 490 same-sex marriages were performed in West Virginia in 2014 and 2015, respectively, with most performed in Cabell County at 155, followed by Kanawha County at 107, Wood County at 61, Monongalia County at 51, Ohio County at 47, and Harrison County at 40. Same-sex marriages represented about 4% of all marriages conducted in 2015. The 2020 U.S. census showed that there were 2,307 married same-sex couple households (917 male couples and 1,390 female couples) and 2,570 unmarried same-sex couple households in West Virginia.

== Public opinion ==
Public opinion for same-sex marriage in West Virginia
Poll source	Dates administered	Sample size	Margin of error	Support	Opposition	Do not know / refused
Public Religion Research Institute	February 28 – December 8, 2025	174 adults	?	52%	44%	4%
Public Religion Research Institute	March 13 – December 2, 2024	196 adults	?	51%	43%	6%
Public Religion Research Institute	March 9 – December 7, 2023	157 adults	?	54%	42%	4%
Public Religion Research Institute	March 11 – December 14, 2022	?	?	62%	38%	<0.5%
Public Religion Research Institute	March 8 – November 9, 2021	?	?	56%	44%	<0.5%
Public Religion Research Institute	January 7 – December 20, 2020	296 adults	?	67%	27%	4%
Public Religion Research Institute	April 5 – December 23, 2017	503 adults	?	48%	45%	7%
Public Religion Research Institute	May 18, 2016 – January 10, 2017	784 adults	?	37%	55%	8%
Public Religion Research Institute	April 29, 2015 – January 7, 2016	640 adults	?	45%	50%	5%

According to the 2016 Public Religion Research Institute (PRRI) survey, West Virginia was one of only three U.S. states where a majority of residents were opposed to same-sex marriage; the others being Arkansas and Mississippi.

== See also ==
- LGBTQ rights in West Virginia
- Politics of West Virginia
- Same-sex marriage in the United States
