= Menk (surname) =

Menk is a surname. Notable people with the surname include:

- Eric Menk (born 1974), a Filipino-American basketball player
- Gerhard Menk (1946–2019) a German historian and archivist
- Ismail ibn Musa Menk (born 1975), a Zimbabwean Islamic scholar
- Louis W. Menk (1918–1999), an American railway worker and executive
