= Christine Menias =

American radiologist, Mayo Clinic professor, and medical journal editor

Christine O. Menias
- Born: Cairo, Egypt
- Education: Marquette University (BS); George Washington University School of Medicine (MD)
- Occupations: Radiologist, author
- Years active: 1995–present
- Employer(s): Washington University in St. Louis; Mayo Clinic College of Medicine and Science

Christine O. "Cooky" Menias is an American radiologist.

== Early life and education ==
Menias was born in Cairo, Egypt. She attended Marquette University for her undergraduate degree and received a B.S. in biology and French in 1990. In 1995, Menias obtained her M.D. from the George Washington University School of Medicine before completing her residency and abdominal imaging fellowship at the Mallinckrodt Institute of Radiology (MIR) at Washington University School of Medicine in St. Louis.

== Career ==
=== Higher education ===
Menias began her career in diagnostic radiology as a body imager in the abdominal imaging section before serving as co-director of body computed tomography and emergency radiology and the assistant residency program director of radiology at Washington University's Mallinckrodt Institute of Radiology. Menias currently holds an adjunct professorship at the institution. After 15 years on the faculty of Washington University, Menias joined Mayo Clinic College of Medicine and Science in Phoenix, Arizona, in 2013 as professor of radiology. In 2016, she became the chair of the abdominal imaging section at Mayo Clinic Arizona until 2020.

Menias also lectured as visiting professor at multiple national and international universities and hospitals. Receiving the 2016 Society of Abdominal Radiology's Igor Laufer, M.D. Traveling Visiting Professor Award provided Menias the opportunity to visit over 20 university programs both domestically and internationally.

Menias' work focuses primarily on abdominal imaging with special interests in oncologic, transplant, gynecologic, and emergency radiology.

=== Writing ===
In line with her career, Menias is a prolific author in radiology. She has published/edited 6 books, multiple book chapters, and over 280 peer-reviewed manuscripts. Her published books include:

- Specialty Imaging: Pitfalls and Classic Signs of the Abdomen and Pelvis, by KM Elsayes, Christine Menias, AM Shaaban, 2011.
- Gastrointestinal Imaging Cases (McGraw-Hill Radiology), by Stephan W. Anderson, Christine Menias, Jorge A. Soto, 2012.
- Diagnostic Imaging: Gynecology, by AM Shaaban, Christine Menias, M Rezvani, M Tubay, R El Sayed, PJ Woodward, 2014.
- The Dark Side of Radiology: Multispecialty After-Hours Imaging, by JB Kruskal, Christine Menias, 2015.
- Oncologic Imaging: From Diagnosis to Cure, by AM Paladin, Christine Menias, K Sandrasegaran, 2016.
- A Practical and Current Approach for Managing Incidental Findings, by S Bhalla, J Kruskal, Christine Menias, 2017.

Menias served as the associate editor of gynecologic imaging for Abdominal Radiology and serves as editorial board chair for abdominal imaging for RadioGraphics. In October 2019, The Board of Directors of the Radiological Society of North America (RSNA) announced Menias will be the next editor of RadioGraphics beginning in January 2021. As the peer-reviewed journal's first female editor, Menias will succeed Jeffrey S. Klein.
