= Epididymal cyst =

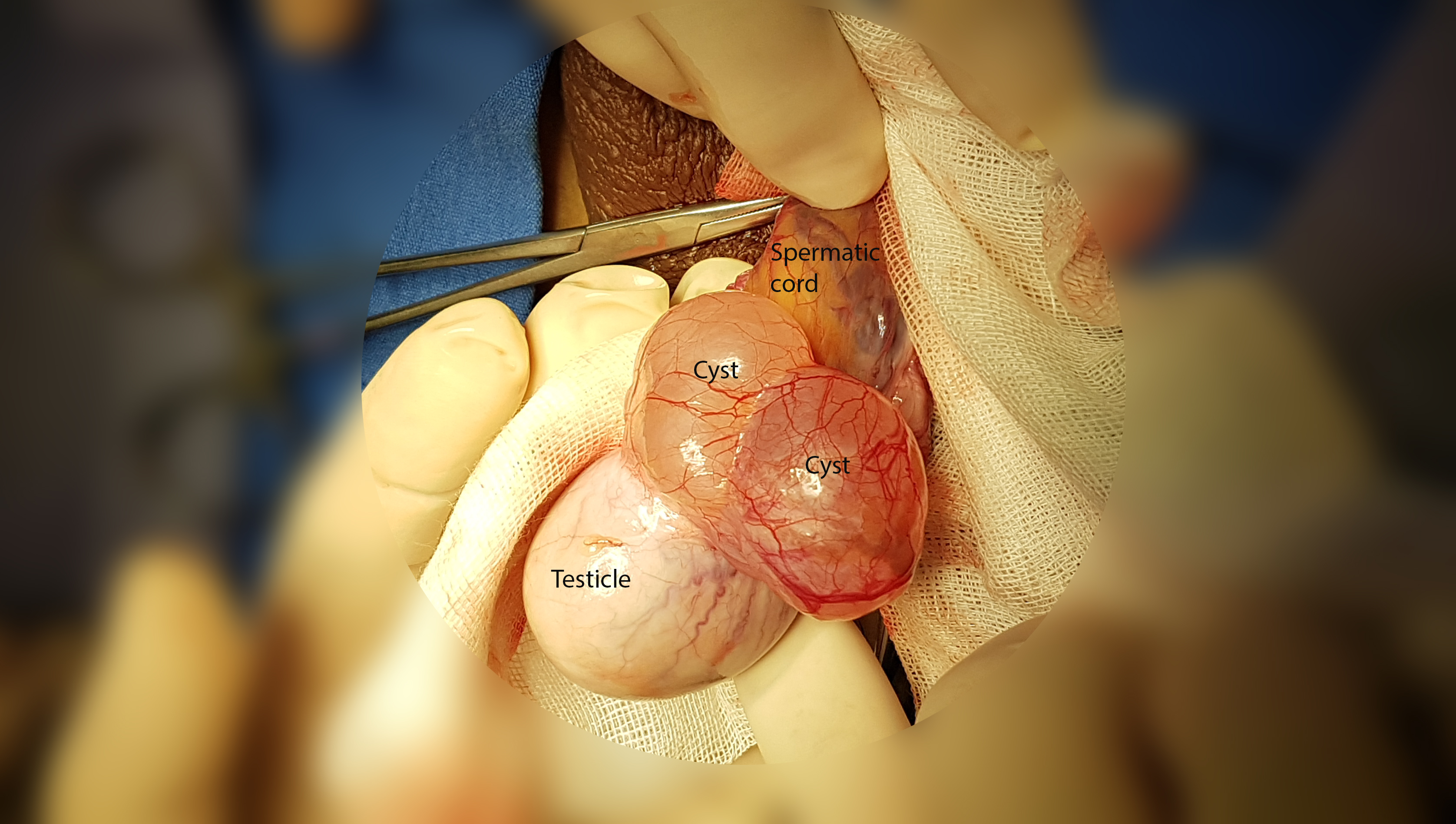
- Epidydymal cyst (benign tumor)
- Specialty: Urology
- Symptoms: Scrotal mass and pain.
- Diagnostic method: Ultrasound.

Epididymal cyst is a harmless sac in the testicles filled with fluid. The most frequent clinical presentation occurs when a routine physical examination yields an unexpected finding, which is then confirmed by scrotal ultrasonography. Although the exact cause of epididymal cysts is unknown, it is likely a congenital anomaly associated with hormonal imbalances during the embryonic stage of development.

== Signs and symptoms ==
An epididymal cyst, a benign cystic fluid collection in the scrotum, usually manifests as a painless swelling on top of the testicle and can be inadvertently discovered during a physical examination. The most typical clinical findings are a scrotal mass and pain.

== Causes ==
The exact cause of an epididymal cyst is unknown, but it is most likely a congenital anomaly associated with hormonal imbalances during embryonic life. Previous research has shown a correlation between the development of epididymal cysts and maternal exposure to endocrine-disrupting substances like diethylstilbestrol during male fetal development. It has been determined that the causes of epididymal cysts in children are vasal or epididymal obstruction and environmental endocrine disruptors. There has also been a suggestion that the testicular dysgenesis syndrome may include an epididymal cyst.

== Diagnosis ==
An ultrasound is used to confirm 20–30% of epididymal cysts that are found during a physical examination.

== Treatment ==
An epididymal cyst usually resolves on its own over time and doesn't need to be surgically removed. Nonetheless, patients who experience excruciating scrotal pain or whose cyst size does not appear to be involuted are advised to have their epididymal cysts surgically removed.

== See also ==
- Spermatocele
- Epididymitis
