= Spermatocelectomy =

Surgical removal of a spermatocele

- Specialty: Urology

A spermatocelectomy is a surgical procedure performed to remove a spermatocele by separating it from the epididymis. The patient is given an anesthetic in the groin and a small incision is made into the scrotum. The surgeon pulls the testicle and epididymis to the incision and separates the spermatocele by tying it off with a suture. The surgeon then removes it, and stitches up the area.
