= Friedrich Albert von Zenker =

German pathologist and

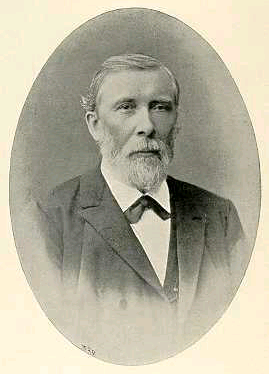
- Born: March 13, 1825; Dresden, Saxony
- Died: June 13, 1898 (aged 73); Plau am See, Mecklenburg
- Occupations: Pathologist, physician

Friedrich Albert von Zenker (13 March 1825 – 13 June 1898) was a German pathologist and physician, celebrated for his discovery of trichinosis.

He was born in Dresden, and was educated in Leipzig and Heidelberg. While in Leipzig, he worked for a while as an assistant to Justus Radius at the St. Georg Hospital. Attached to the city hospital of Dresden in 1851, he added, in 1855, the duties of professor of pathological anatomy and general pathology in the surgico-medical academy of that city. In 1862 he became professor of pathological anatomy and pharmacology at Erlangen. Three years afterwards he assumed with Hugo Wilhelm von Ziemssen the editorship of the "Deutsches Archiv für klinische Medizin". In 1895 he retired from active service.

Zenker's diverticulum, a false pathological diverticulum of the posterior pharyngeal wall, through the thyropharyngeus and cricopharyngeus parts of the inferior constrictor muscle, is named after him.

His important discovery of the danger of trichina dates from 1860. In that year he published "Ueber die Trichinenkrankheit des Menschen" (in volume xviii of VirchowsArchiv).

In 1865 he was awarded the Monthyon Prize by the French Academy of Sciences.

== See also ==
- Zenker's degeneration
- Zenker's diverticulum
- Zenker's paralysis
