= Gustav Killian =

Gustav Killian (2 June 1860 – 24 February 1921) was a German laryngologist and founder of the bronchoscopy.

== Life and death ==
His father Johann Baptist Caesar Killian (1820–1889), the son of a städtischen Wegeaufsehers an urban way overseer, was a doctor of philosophiae and high school teacher born in Mainz and later living in Bensheim. His mother Apollonia (1833–1865), née Höpfel died early, at age 31 of cholera.

He was also born in Mainz, and educated at the University of Freiburg-im-Breisgau. He made revolutionary advances in the diagnosis and treatment of affections of the infralaryngeal passages, especially in the diagnosis and removal of foreign bodies in the bronchial tubes, by means of his new art of bronchoscopic control. His first college appointment was as assistant to Professor Hack of the chair of otolaryngology in Mainz. The sudden death of Wilhelm Hack (1851–1887) led to his succession by Killian, although he was not made professor at the time. His revolutionary activity on bronchoscopy gained him an appointment as professor of laryngology in the University of Berlin at the Charité; this was the first professorship of such scope in Germany. Killian introduced another innovation known as suspension laryngoscopy into the technic of his specialty. He wrote no monograph on the bronchoscope, and the omission has been supplied by his pupils. His book, Die Schwebelaryngoscopic, appeared in 1920; and in collaboration with Voss was written a volume on military experience, Gehörorgan, Obere Luft und Speisengänge (1921). A Festschrift volume was published around 1920.

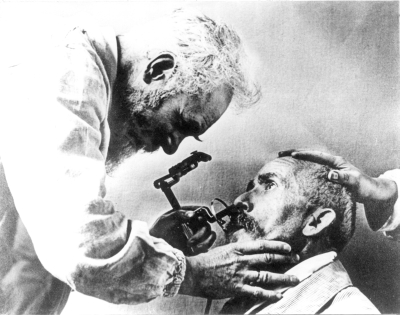
Gustav Killian.

== Term ==
Killian's operation -

- Excision of the anterior wall of the frontal sinus, removal of the diseased tissue, and formation of a permanent communication with the nose. -The American Illustrated Medical Dictionary (1938)

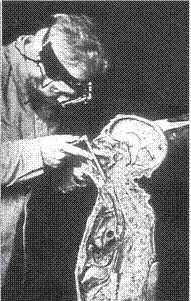
Killian demonstrates the rigid bronchoscopy in a cadaver specimen

== Killian's works ==
- Über die Bursa und Tonsilla pharyngea (1888)
- Die Untersuchung der hinteren Larynxwand (1890)
- Die Nebenhöhlen der Nase in ihren Lagebeziehungen zu den Nachbarorganen (1903). English edition: The Accessory sinuses of the nose and their relations to neighbouring parts (1904)
- Die Schwebelaryngoskopie und ihre praktische Verwertung (1920)

== See also ==
- Killian's dehiscence
- Inokichi Kubo
