= Spermatocele =

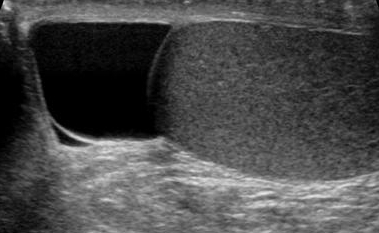
- Ultrasound of a testicle (grey) and a spermatocele (black)
- Pronunciation: /spɜːrˈmætəsiːl/
- Specialty: Urology

Spermatocele is a fluid-filled cyst that develops in the epididymis. The fluid is usually a clear or milky white color and may contain sperm. Spermatoceles are typically filled with spermatozoa and they can vary in size from several millimeters to many centimeters. Small spermatoceles are relatively common, occurring in an estimated 30 percent of males. They are generally not painful. However, some people may experience discomfort such as a dull pain in the scrotum from larger spermatoceles. They are not cancerous, nor do they cause an increased risk of testicular cancer. Additionally, unlike varicoceles, they do not reduce fertility.

== History ==
"Spermatocele" is originally derived from the Greek term spermatos (sperm) and kele (cavity or mass). Oftentimes, "epididymal cyst" has been used interchangeably with "spermatocele." Epididymal cysts may appear anywhere along or within the epididymis and do not contain sperm, whereas spermatoceles may contain sperm. Epididymal cysts have been shown to occur more frequently in children before reaching puberty.

== Epidemiology ==
Spermatoceles usually affect men who are middle-aged and can, although rarely, affect children during puberty. The incidence rate is around 5-20% for children. It is estimated that approximately 30 percent of men have been diagnosed with small spermatoceles while less have larger spermatoceles. The incidence of spermatoceles increases as men age. Before puberty, children from the male sex may develop a similar benign mass called epididymis cyst. Although both epididymis cyst and spermatocele may be referred as the same, the epididymis cyst does not contain sperm and it can occur anywhere within the epididymis. It can be differentiated through an ultrasound imagining. Epididymis cysts larger than 10mm in diameter are recommended for surgery but if there is no problem then surgery is discouraged as it can affect fertility in the future.

=== Chronic infectious epididymitis ===
Chronic infectious epididymitis is rare. Some signs and symptoms include localized tenderness and swelling in the epididymis, which are different from any tenderness/abnormality present in the testis, these are usually not found in lower urinary tract. Chronic infectious epididymitis may be diagnosed in healthy adolescents as well as men. Some factors that predispose individuals to chronic infectious epididymitis include sexual activity, heavy physical exertion, and bicycle or motorcycle riding. Those diagnosed with chronic or recurrent epididymitis should receive a CT scan with contrast and a prostate ultrasonography to rule out structural abnormality of the urinary tract. If suspected to have chronic infectious epididymitis, one should consider getting a urinalysis, urine culture, and urine nucleic acid amplification tests for presence of Neisseria gonorrhoeae and Chlamydia trachomatis. Management of chronic infectious epididymitis is similar to management of acute infectious epididymitis, rarely does treatment extend to surgical management.

=== Chronic noninfectious epididymitis ===
Trauma, autoimmune disease, or vasculitis can cause chronic noninfectious epididymitis, but no clear cause or origin of the disease is found in most cases. Noninfectious epididymitis that happens spontaneously might be caused by the reflux of urine through the ejaculatory ducts and vas deferens into the epididymis, producing inflammation that leads to swelling and ductal obstruction. Men with history of vasectomy are also predisposed to chronic nonifectious epididymitis. Typical inciting factors include prolonged periods of sitting (long plane or car travel, sedentary desk jobs) or vigorous exercise (heavy lifting). Acute infectious epididymitis are often associated with more tenderness and swelling, whereas chronic noninfectious epididymitis tend to have less tenderness and swelling upon examination. Thorough past medical history and physical examination can help with determining the diagnosis. It is often that individuals with chronic noninfectious epididymitis will present with a history of a lack of symptom improvement while on antibiotic therapy. Management of chronic noninfectious epididymitis includes scrotal elevation, nonsteroidal anti-inflammatory drugs (NSAIDs) such as ibuprofen (unless unable to take for medical reasons), and it is recommended that individuals avoid physical activities that may cause said symptoms. Those with sedentary jobs or often experience prolonged periods of time sitting should practice physical mobility more frequently.

== Risk factors ==
It is not well known what may be causing the growth of a spermatocele. It has been observed that pregnant women who were prescribed diethylstilbestrol (DES) to prevent pregnancy complications, such as miscarriage, and gave birth to a son most likely increased the risk of the son to develop a spermatocele in the future. However, doctors stopped prescribing this medication in 1971 since it increased the risk of women developing a rare vaginal cancer.

== Causes ==
Spermatoceles can originate as diverticulum from the tubules found in the head of the epididymis. Sperm accumulation gradually causes the diverticulum to increase in size, causing a spermatocele. While there are many tubules connecting the epididymis to the testis, a blockage in one of the tubules may lead to formation of a cyst. In many instances they appear to occur spontaneously without any preceding instances of injury.

Scarring of any part of the epididymis due to trauma or inflammation can cause it to become obstructed and in turn form a spermatocele.

== Diagnosis ==
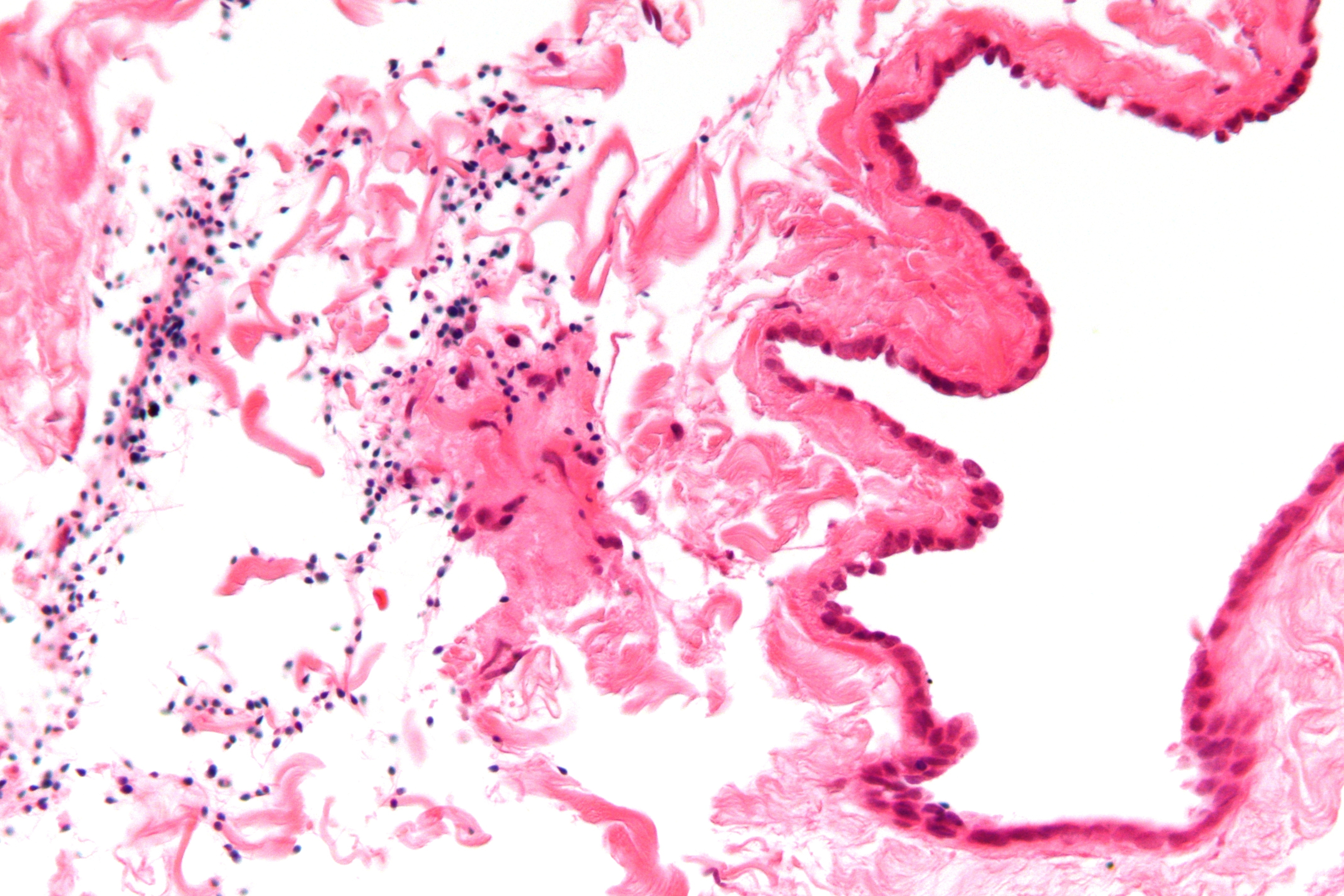
Micrograph of a spermatocele. The characteristic sperm are present (black dots - left of image). H&E stain.

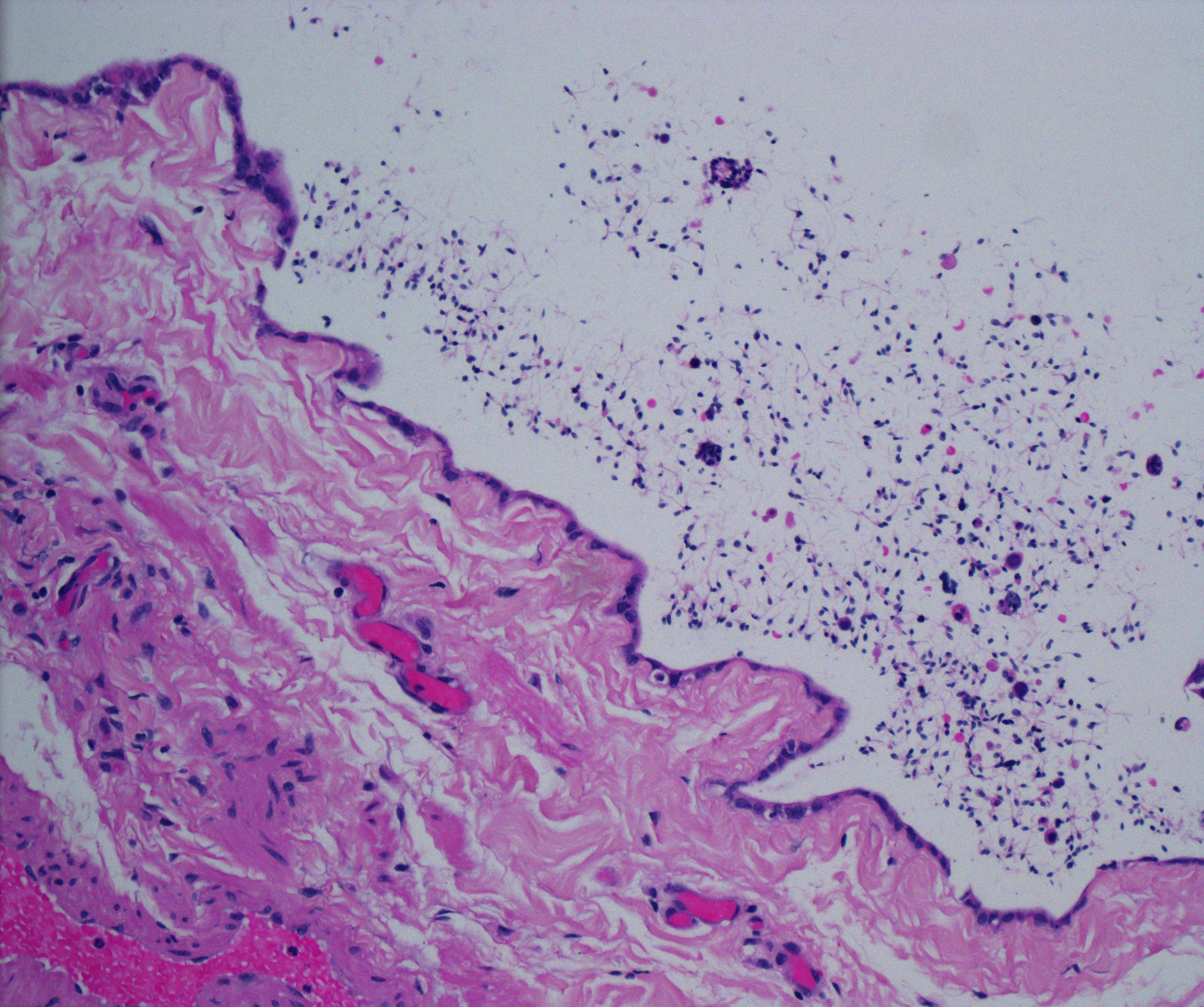
Dilated rete testis containing spermatozoa within cyst lumen. H&E stain 20x

Spermatoceles can be discovered as incidental scrotal masses found on physical examination by a physician or by self-inspection of the scrotum and testicles. The various types of diagnosis for spermatocele types include hydrocele, varicocele, hernia, simple epididymal cyst, and neoplasm.

The primary care physician may diagnose and manage benign causes of scrotal masses such as hydrocele, varicocele and spermatocele. However, if a "must not miss" diagnosis related to testicular masses such as testicular torsion, epididymitis, acute orchitis, strangulated hernia and testicular cancer is suspected, the family physician must refer to a urologist. Finding a painless, cystic mass at the head of the epididymis that is clearly separate from the testicle can indicate a spermatocele. Shining a light through the mass, a process known as transillumination, can also help differentiate between a fluid-filled cyst and a tumor, which would not allow as much light to pass. If uncertainty exists, ultrasonography of the scrotum can confirm the presence of a spermatocele. The location and history of any scrotal masses are crucial in determining whether or not the mass is benign or malignant. Lab tests such as a complete blood count (CBC test) or urine test can also be conducted to check for any possible infection or signs of inflammation.

Spermatoceles come in varying sizes and shapes. Some spermatoceles are very small and can only be detected through an ultrasound. More commonly seen are spermatoceles that are a pea-sized lump. They tend to form above or behind a testicle and have a shape and size that looks like a pea. Larger growths have been reported to look similar to a third testicle and can be very discomforting. For those who are affected with large spermatoceles, some have reported feeling pain, heaviness, and fullness in the affected testicle.

=== When to see a doctor ===
If a person is experiencing pain and/or swelling in the scrotum or if a person notices a physical difference such as a mass during a testicular self-exam then they must seek medical attention quickly to help rule out any other causes and begin treatment.

== Special populations ==
=== Spermatoceles in children ===
Epididymal cysts may arise in children due to numerous different reasons. They may even originate from a disturbance in endocrine factors during the development of the embryo. The incidence of these cysts are possibly linked to boys who are exposed to diethylstilbestrol, an estrogen medication, while in the fetus.

Although the evidence and information for incidence of spermatoceles in children is lacking, there are general management guidelines for caregivers who may encounter spermatoceles in their children. Epididymal cysts are typically benign in nature. However, caregivers should take note of any discomfort and symptoms in children, including but not limited to, erythema, scrotal edema or swelling. Epididymal cysts appear in approximately 70% of boys who present as asymptomatic. The diagnosis of epididymal cysts in children can be discovered upon physical examination and eventually confirmed via ultrasound.

== Treatment ==
Small cysts as well as asymptomatic larger cysts are better left alone and carefully observed. However, treatment can be considered if the cysts are causing discomfort/pain, enlarging in size, or per patient request. There are a few different treatment options, ranging in levels of invasiveness.

=== Medications ===
Certain drugs such as oral analgesics or anti-inflammatory medications can be taken by mouth to decrease spermatocele-related symptoms such as pain and/or swelling. At the moment, there is no medication that can inhibit the production of a spermatocele or cure it. Common medications recommended by doctors are acetaminophen (Tylenol) that can treat pain. To treat the inflammation and pain, non-steroidal anti-inflammatory drugs (NSAIDs) are recommended such as ibuprofen (Motrin, Advil), naproxen (Aleve), and others. Antibiotics may also be prescribed in cases where risk of infection and discomfort is indicated.

=== Medical Procedures ===
Aspiration and sclerotherapy are treatments that remove fluid from the spermatocele and seal the spermatocele sac closed from further fluid build-up, respectively. Due to a higher risk of epididymis damage, fertility problems, and further recurrences, these procedures are not recommended and not commonly used.

=== Surgical Treatments ===
Surgical treatments must be thoroughly discussed with people prior to any final decisions. Different types of surgical procedures may be chosen based on the extent of risk.

A short procedure called a spermatocelectomy can be performed for spermatoceles that cause irritating symptoms. This standard procedure can be performed in an outpatient setting with the use of local or general anesthesia. This procedure typically consists of removing the spermatocele and a portion of the epididymis. The risk of epididymal injury is 17.12%. This incident may happen when the spermatocele is being dissected from the head of the epididymis. Spermatocelectomy can cause complications such as hematoma, wound infection, scrotal abscess as well as recurrence. After surgery, the doctor may recommend to apply ice packs for several days to help reduce swelling. Oral pain medications can also be taken for a few days to reduce discomfort. In addition, the patient returns 2–6 weeks after to inspect any progress/complications. If received a vasectomy, then two semen samples must be collected and analyzed after 6–12 weeks post-operation and several ejaculations. The centrifuged semen samples are used to look for the absence of viable sperm in the semen.

==== Risk of Complications ====
After surgical removal, it is possible that the pain will persist and recurrence can occur. Fertility may be compromised with these surgical procedures, so people may consider postponing surgery until after having children. If the pain is intolerable and the person would like to get the spermatocele removed immediately, the person should talk to his doctor about the possibility of freezing or donating sperm in case infertility occurs.

== Male reproductive system ==
Image of the male reproductive system

Spermatoceles are important to not be ignored as it can affect the male reproductive system. The testes are organs inside the scrotum that create sperm as well as sex hormones and testosterone. The sperm in the testes move to the epididymis which is a long, coiled tube behind the testes. The primary function is to store and mature sperm so it can fertilize the egg. However, if the epididymis becomes injured, then there is a chance that the sperm will not mature and a man will not be able to reproduce with a woman. Therefore, serious thought must be considered when undergoing spermatocelectomy.

== Prevention and screening ==
There is no way to prevent a spermatocele from forming, but there are routines that can be established to help identify any changes in a person's scrotum such as masses, abnormalities, or discomfort. Performing a monthly testicular self-exam can improve the person's chances of identifying spermatoceles or any abnormalities quickly.

It is best to perform a testicular self-exam after a warm shower to help the scrotum relax. To properly exam the scrotum, look for any swelling on the skin and examine each testicle by rolling the testicle between the thumbs and the fingers. A normal testicle is oval-shaped and will usually feel smooth and firm. It is also not uncommon for the testicles to be different sizes.

Upon physical examination, if a 'lump' is found during the testicular exam, further screening may be performed via ultrasound to eliminate testicular cancer.

== See also ==
- hydrocele
- orchitis
- rete tubular ectasia
- testicular torsion
- tumor
- varicocele
