= Zenker's degeneration =

Medical condition of skeletal muscles

Zenker's degeneration is a severe glassy or waxy hyaline degeneration or necrosis of skeletal muscles in acute infectious diseases; a prototype of coagulative necrosis.

The condition was named by Friedrich Albert von Zenker. It is a hyaline degeneration of skeletal muscles such as rectus abdominis and diaphragm, and occurs in severe toxaemia as typhoid fever. It is also seen in electrical burns. Grossly the muscles appear pale and friable; microscopically, the muscle fibres are swollen, have a loss of cross striations, and show a hyaline appearance. Rupture and small hemorrhage may complicate the lesion. Coagulative necrosis occurs here.
