= Killian's dehiscence =

Gap in the muscular wall of the pharynx

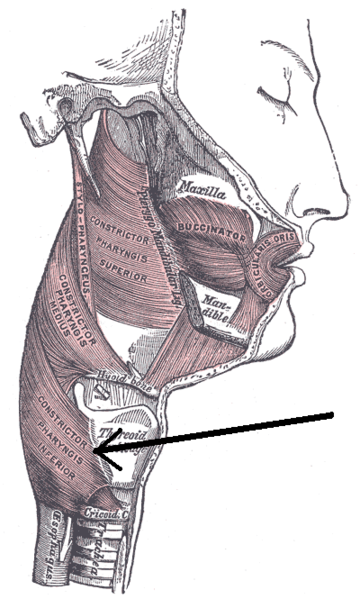
- Muscles of the pharynx (throat)and cheek. (Constrictor pharyngis inferior visible at bottom left.)

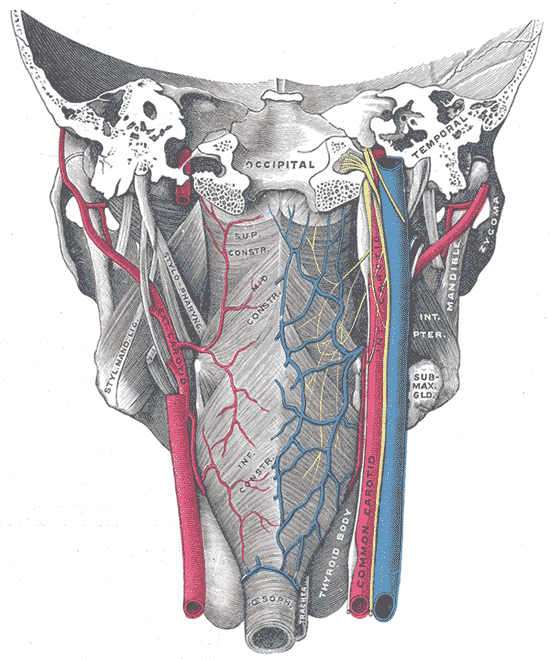
- Muscles of the pharynx, viewed from behind, together with the associated vessels and nerves. (Inf. const. labeled at bottom center.)

Killian's dehiscence (also known as Killian's triangle) is a triangular area in the wall of the pharynx between the cricopharyngeus (upper esophageal sphincter (UES)) and thyropharyngeus (Inferior pharyngeal constrictor muscle) which are the two parts of the inferior constrictors (also see Pharyngeal pouch). It can be seen as a locus minoris resistentiae (place of low resistance). A similar triangular area between circular fibres of the cricopharyngeus and longitudinal fibres of the esophagus is Lamier's triangle or Lamier-Hackermann's area.

== Clinical significance ==
It represents a potentially weak spot where a pharyngoesophageal diverticulum (Zenker's diverticulum) is more likely to occur.

== Eponym ==
It is named after the German ENT surgeon Gustav Killian.
