= Zenker's diverticulum =

- Other names: Pharyngoesophageal diverticulum, pharyngeal pouch, hypopharyngeal diverticulum
- Specialty: Gastroenterology

A Zenker's diverticulum, also pharyngeal pouch, is a diverticulum of the mucosa of the human pharynx, just above the cricopharyngeal muscle (i.e. above the upper sphincter of the esophagus). It is a pseudo diverticulum or false diverticulum (only involving the mucosa and submucosa of the esophageal wall, not the adventitia), also known as a pulsion diverticulum.

It was named in 1877 after German pathologist Friedrich Albert von Zenker.

== Signs and symptoms ==
When there is excessive pressure within the lower pharynx, the weakest portion of the pharyngeal wall balloons out, forming a diverticulum which may reach several centimetres in diameter.

While traction and pulsion mechanisms have long been deemed the main factors promoting development of a Zenker's diverticulum, current consensus considers occlusive mechanisms to be most important: uncoordinated swallowing, impaired relaxation and spasm of the cricopharyngeus muscle lead to an increase in pressure within the distal pharynx, so that its wall herniates through the point of least resistance (known as Killian's triangle, located superior to the cricopharyngeus muscle and inferior to the thyropharyngeus muscle. Thyropharyngeus and cricopharyngeus are the superior and inferior parts of inferior constrictor muscle of pharynx respectively). The result is an outpouching of the posterior pharyngeal wall, just above the esophagus.

While it may be asymptomatic, Zenker diverticulum can present with the following symptoms:

- Dysphagia (difficulty swallowing), and sense of a lump in the throat
- Food might get trapped in the outpouching, leading to:
  - Regurgitation, reappearance of ingested food in the mouth
  - Cough, due to food regurgitated into the airway
  - Halitosis, smelly breath, as stagnant food is digested by microorganisms
  - Infection

It rarely, if ever, causes any pain.

Esophageal webs are seen associated in 50% of patients with this condition.

Rarer forms of cervical esophageal diverticula are the Killian's diverticulum and the Laimer's diverticulum. Killian's diverticulum is formed in the Killian-Jamiseon triangle (between the oblique and transverse fibers of the cricopharyngeus muscle). Laimer's diverticulum is formed in Laimer's triangle (located inferior to the cricopharyngeus in the posterior midline above the confluence of the longitudinal layer of the superior esophageal circular muscle). Laimer's triangle is covered only by the circular layer of esophageal muscle.

== Diagnosis ==
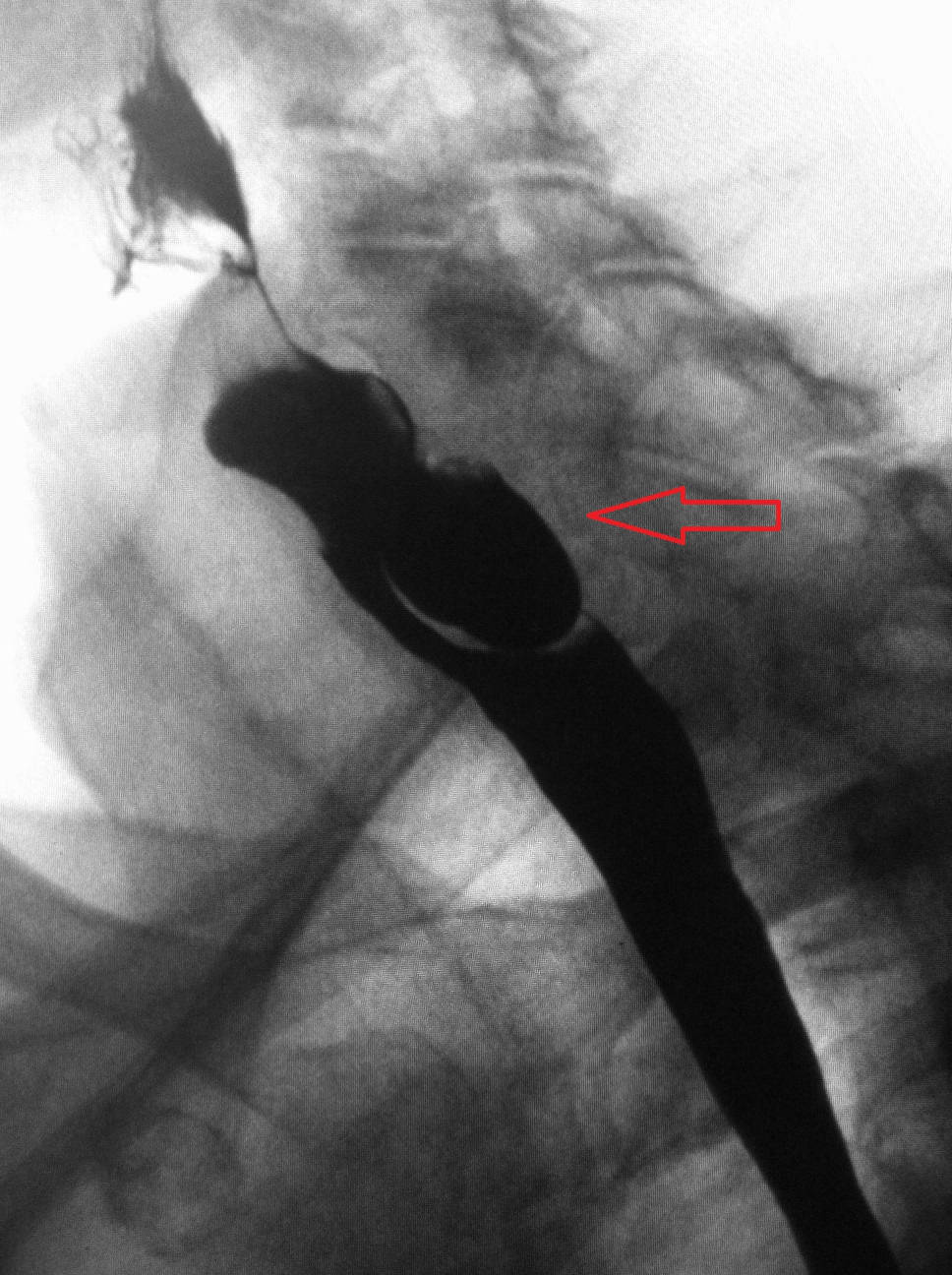
Lateral X-ray of a Zenker's diverticulum

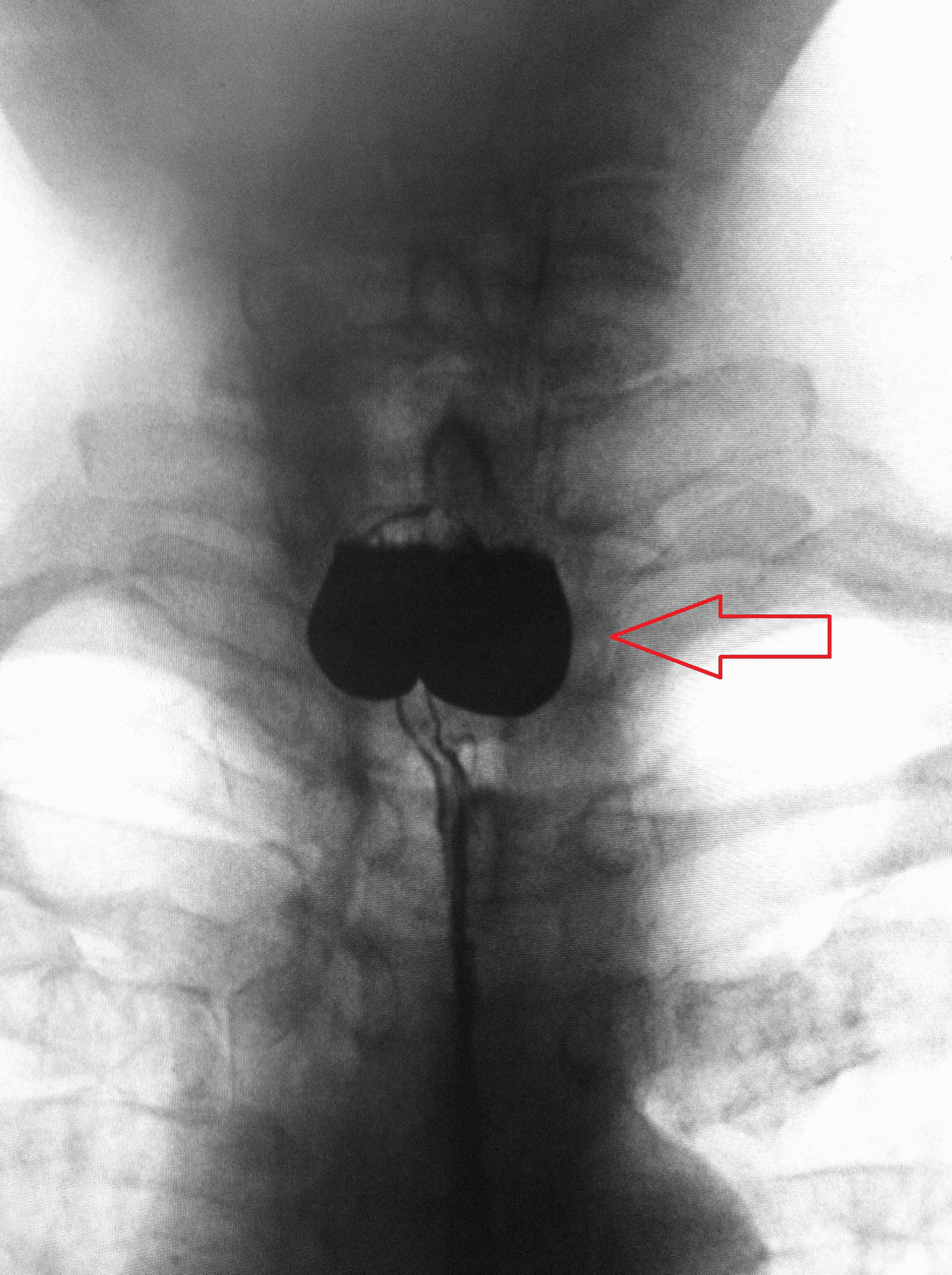
AP X-ray of a Zenker's diverticulum

A combination of the simple barium swallow and a thorough endoscopy will normally confirm the diverticulum.

== Treatment ==
If small (ie, <2 cm) and asymptomatic, no treatment is necessary. Larger, symptomatic cases of Zenker's diverticulum have been traditionally treated by neck surgery to resect the diverticulum and incise the cricopharyngeus muscle. However, in recent times non-surgical endoscopic techniques have gained more importance (as they allow for much faster recovery), and the currently preferred treatment is endoscopic stapling (i.e. diverticulotomy with staples). This may be performed through a diverticuloscope. Other methods include fibreoptic diverticular repair.

Other non-surgical treatment modalities also exist, such as endoscopic laser, which recent evidence suggests is less effective than stapling.

== Epidemiology ==
Zenker's diverticulum mainly affects older adults. It has an incidence of 2 per 100,000 per year in the UK, but there is significant geographical variation around the world.
