= Seminal tract =

The seminal tract is a part of the male reproductive system and consists of seminiferous tubules (tubuli seminiferi recti, rete testis, efferent ducts), epididymides (appendix), Vas deferens (ampulla) and ejaculatory ducts.
