= Tubule =

Small tube

In biology, a tubule is a general term referring to small tube or similar type of structure. Specifically, tubule can refer to:

- a small tube or fistular structure
- a minute tube lined with glandular epithelium
- any hollow cylindrical body structure
- a minute canal found in various structures or organs of the body
- a slender elongated anatomical channel
- a minute tube, especially as an anatomical structure.

== Examples of tubules ==
- Collecting tubules: terminal channels of the nephrons
- Cuvierian tubules: clusters of sticky tubules located at the base of the respiratory tree, which may be discharged by some sea cucumbers (holothurians) when mechanically stimulated (i.e. being threatened by a predator)
- Dentinal tubules or dental canaliculi: minute channels in the dentine of a tooth that extend from the pulp cavity to the cementum or the enamel
- Distal convoluted tubule: the convoluted portion of the vertebrate nephron that lies between the loop of Henle and the nonsecretory part of the nephron and that is concerned especially with the concentration of urine
- Galactophorous tubule or lactiferous ducts: small channels for the passage of milk from the secreting cells in the mammary gland to the nipple
- Loop of Henle: the long U-shaped part of the renal tubule, extending through the medulla from the end of the proximal convoluted tubule. It begins with a descending limb (comprising the proximal straight tubule and the thin tubule ), followed by the ascending limb (the distal straight tubule ), and ending at the distal convoluted tubule
- Malpighian tubule: any of the excretory organs in insects that lie in the abdominal body cavity and empty into the junction between the midgut and hindgut
- Mesonephric tubule: tubules comprising the mesonephros or temporary kidney of amniotes
- Metanephric tubule: tubules comprising the permanent kidney of amniotes
- Microtubule: a microscopically small tubule
- Proximal convoluted tubule: the portion of the nephron immediately after the glomerulus
- Renal tubule: the minute canals made up of basement membrane and lined with epithelium, composing the substance of the kidney and secreting, reabsorbing, collecting and conducting the urine. Include proximal convoluted, the nephron loop (containing the proximal straight tubule, descending and ascending thin, and the distal straight tubules) and the distal convoluted tubules
- Seminiferous tubules: any of the numerous long convoluted tubules in the testis which are the sites where spermatozoa mature
- T tubule: transverse intracellular tubules invaginating from the cell membrane and surrounding the myofibrils of the T system of skeletal and cardiac muscle, serving as a pathway for the spread of electrical excitation within a muscle cell
- Trachea: tubules forming the respiratory system of most insects and many arachnids
- Uriniferous tubules: any of the small tubules that are the excretory units of the vertebrate kidney
- Uveoscleral pathway: a tubule that drains excess aqueous humor
- Vasa efferentia: convoluted tubules that lead from the rete testis to the vas deferens and form the head of the epididymis
- Vesicular-tubular clusters between the golgi apparatus and endoplasmic reticulum which assist in transport.
