= Lobules of testis =

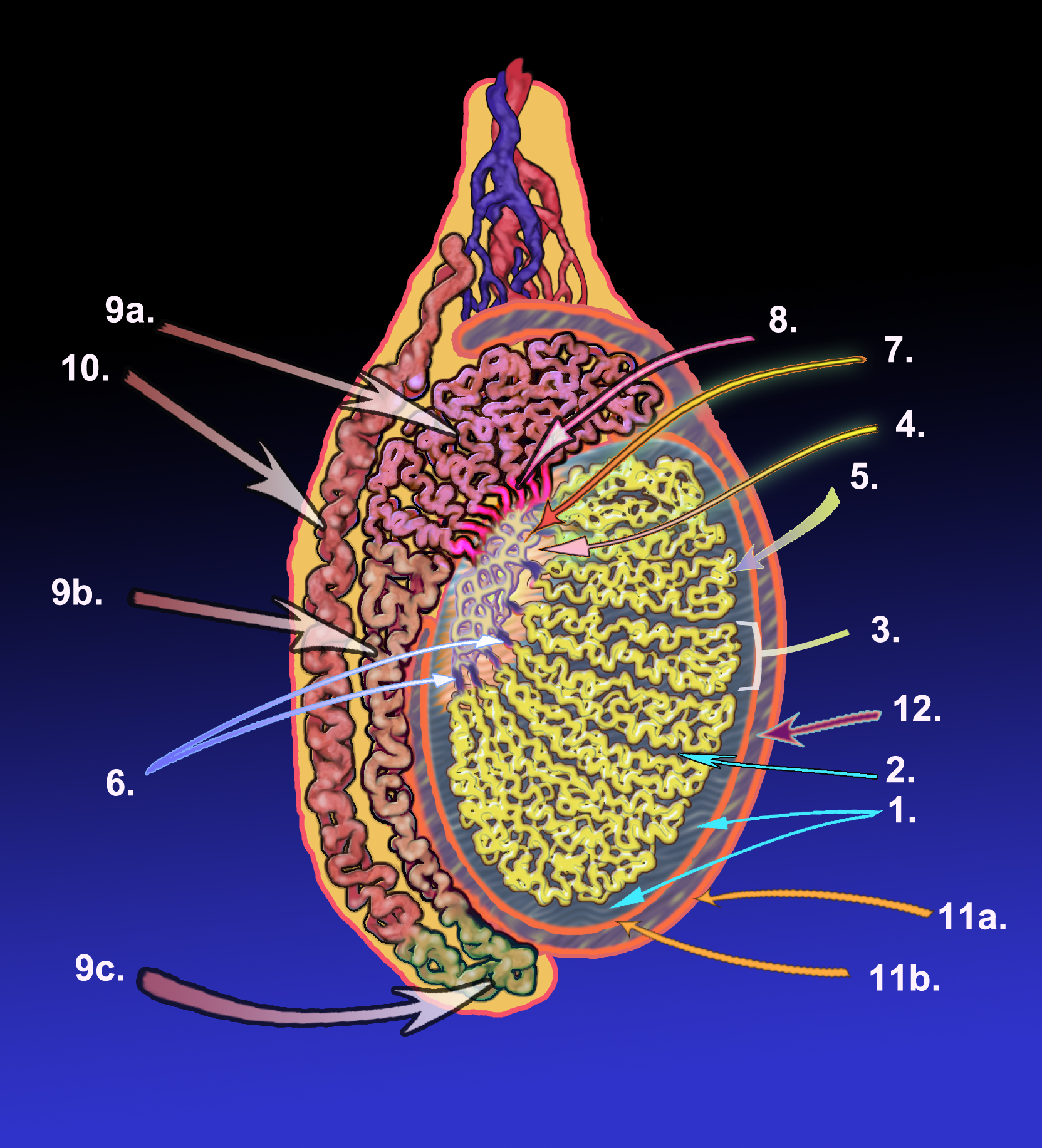
- A diagram of the major components of an adult human testicle, including the following numbered items: 1. Tunica albuginea, 2. Septula testis, 3. Lobulus testis, 4. Mediastinum testis, 5. Tubuli seminiferi contorti, 6. Tubuli seminiferi recti, 7. Rete testis, 8. Ductuli efferentes testis, 9a. Head of epididymis, 9b. Body of epididymis, 9c. Tail of epididymis, 10. Vas deferens, 11a. Tunica vaginalis (parietal lamina), 11b. Tunica vaginalis (visceral lamina), and 12. Cavity of tunica vaginalis.

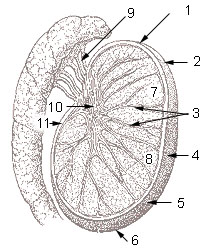
- 1: Head or upper pole of testis, 2: Tunica albuginea, 3: Testicular septa, 4: Anterior margin (free margin), 5: Lateral surface, 6: Tail or lower pole of testis, 7: Testicular lobules, 8: Parenchyma of testis, 9: Efferent ductules, 10: Mediastinum testis, 11: Posterior margin

Details

Identifiers
- Latin: lobuli testis
- FMA: 76512

The lobules of testis are of partitions of the testis formed by septa of testis. The lobules of testis contain the tightly coiled seminiferous tubule. There are some hundreds of lobules in a testicle.

== Anatomy ==
They differ in size according to their position, those in the middle of the gland being larger and longer.

The lobules are conical in shape, the base being directed toward the circumference of the organ, the apex toward the mediastinum testis.

Each lobule is contained in one of the intervals between the fibrous septa which extend between the mediastinum testis and the tunica albuginea (also capsule), and consists of from one to three, or more, minute convoluted tubes, the seminiferous tubules (tubuli seminiferi).

Each tubule extends from the base of the lobule where the tubule ends blindly towards the apex of the lobule.

== Additional images ==
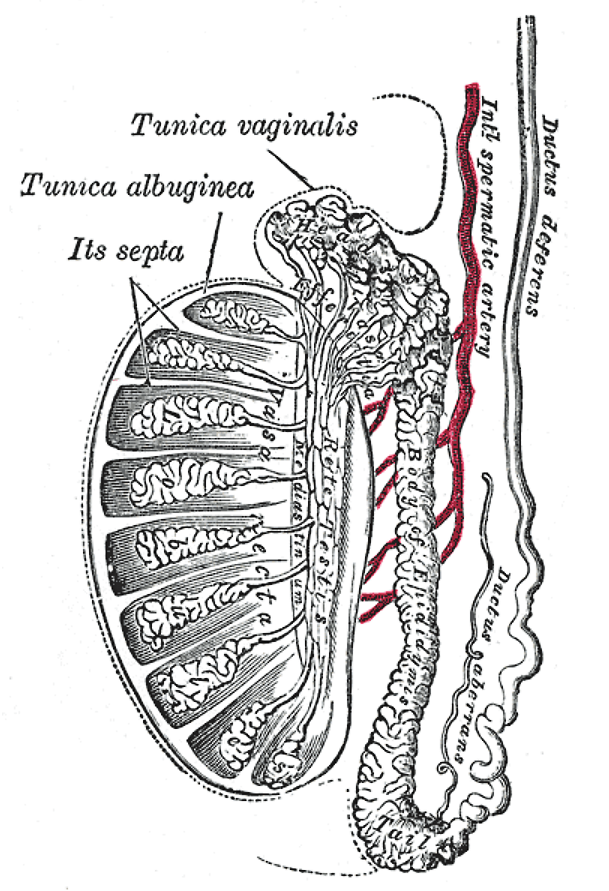
Vertical section of the testis, to show the arrangement of the ducts
