= Tunica =

Tunica may refer to:

- The Latin word for tunic, a type of clothing typical in the ancient world

== Biology ==
- Tunica (biology), a layer, sheath or similar covering
- "Tunica", an anatomical term for a membranous structure lining a cavity, or covering an organ such as a gland or a blood vessel
- Tunica albuginea (disambiguation), three different layers of connective tissue
- Tunica vasculosa (disambiguation), two different vascular layers
- Tunica externa, outermost tunica (layer) of a blood vessel, surrounding the tunica media
- Tunica intima, for short, is the innermost tunica (layer) of an artery or vein

== Other ==
- Tunica, a flowering plant genus now included in Petrorhagia
- Tunica people, a Native American group in the central Mississippi River Valley
- Tunica language, an isolate of the associated Tunica historic peoples in the central Mississippi River Valley
- Tunica-Biloxi, a federally recognized tribe Native American tribe in Louisiana
- Tunica, Louisiana
- Tunica, Mississippi
- Tunica County, Mississippi
- Tunica Lake, Lee County, Arkansas and Tunica County, Mississippi
- Tunica Academy, a non-denominational Christian private school
- Tunica Resorts, Mississippi
