= Tunic (disambiguation) =

Tunic may refer to:

- Tunic, a simple garment type. Sub-types or specific uses include :
  - Tunic top, commonly known as a T-shirt
  - Tunic (military), a type of medium length coat or jacket, worn by military forces
  - Priestly tunic, an undergarment or shirt worn by the High Priest and priests when they served in the Temple in Jerusalem
  - Tunic suit, also known as a Mao Suit or Yat-Sen Suit, a type of chinese menswear often associated with mid-late 20th century chinese leaders.
- Tunic (video game), an action-adventure video game

== See also ==
- Tunica (disambiguation)
- Tunicate
- Tunick (surname)
