= Tunica (biology) =

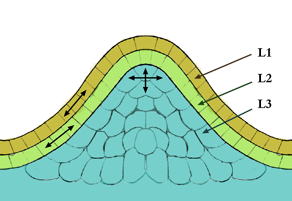
The outer layer of cells of an apical meristem. This is known as the tunica.

In biology, a tunica (/ˈt(j)uːnɪkə/, UK: /ˈtʃuːnɪkə/; pl.: tunicae) is a layer, coat, sheath, or similar covering. The word came to English from the Neo-Latin of science and medicine. Its literal sense is about the same as that of the word tunic, with which it is cognate. In biology, one of its senses used to be the taxonomic name of a genus of plants, but the nomenclature has been revised and those plants are now included in the genus Petrorhagia.

In modern biology in general, tunica occurs as a technical or anatomical term mainly in botany and zoology. It usually refers to membranous structures that line or cover particular organs. In many such contexts, tunica is used interchangeably with tunic according to preference. An organ or organism that has a tunic(a) may be said to be tunicate, as in a tunicate bulb. This adjective tunicate is not to be confused with the noun tunicate, which refers to a member of the subphylum Tunicata.

== Botanical and related usages ==
In botany, there are several contexts for the term.

- As a general, but not comprehensive, descriptive term in botanical anatomy John Lindley in the 19th century defined tunica as "any loose membranous skin not formed from epidermis".
- The apical meristem, in particular in Angiosperms, has an outer layer of cells called the tunica; its role in growth and development differs from that of the inner meristem, or corpus.
- Bulbs and corms often have protective outer coverings of dead material. Particularly in fields such as horticulture and taxonomic description, such bulbs and corms are said to be "tunicate" — having tunics. Usually, such a tunic is derived from the bases of sacrificial dead leaves, often cataphylls specialised for the purpose and dying in place. Such tunics may be delicate, brittle membranes such as those around the bulbs of onions, but the many variations reflect a wide range of adaptations in various species. Many of the larger Amaryllidaceae in particular, for example Boophone species, accumulate thick layers of rot-resistant leaf-base material around their bulbs. Again, corms of iridaceous species, such as some Watsonia and the larger species of Gladiolus, accumulate thick, reticulated, fibrous or woody defences.
- More generally than in describing tunics of bulbs etc., any leaf-sheath or protective bract remaining attached to the plant after the leaf has died may be called a tunica or tunic.
- The testa or spermoderm of a seed is sometimes called the tunic, especially in older books.
- In fungi, the peridium may be referred to as the tunica.
- In Zea mays, the mutant Tunicate1 produces pod corn. Tunicate1 is a mutant of Z. mays MADS19 (ZMM19), in the SHORT VEGETATIVE PHASE gene family. ZMM19 can be ectopically expressed.

== Anatomy usages ==
As an anatomical or morphological reference in anatomy, and zoology, tunica has a range of applications to membranous structures in anatomy, including human anatomy. Such structures are generally coverings or capsules of organs, but also may be linings of cavities. In some cases, such as the walls of macroscopic blood vessels, layers of the tissue of the walls, whether inner, intermediate, or outer, are called tunica of one kind or another. Examples follow, but neither the list nor the discussions are exhaustive.

- In arteries and veins, the inner wall is the tunica intima, the outer wall is the tunica adventitia, and they are separated by the tunica media. More generally, the tunica adventitia or simply the "adventitia" is the outermost connective tissue covering round any internal organ.
- Tunica albuginea is a general term for a tunic of whitish connective tissue. In human anatomy, it generally is applied in three contexts: the fibrous sheath of the corpora cavernosa penis, the fibrous tunic of the testis, and the connective tissue tunic around the ovaries.
- Tunica dartos is a muscular tunic beneath the skin of the scrotum. It is one of the mechanisms for retraction of the testes, largely for temperature control.
- Tunica fibrosa oculi is the fibrous tunic of the eyeball, the outer layer that includes both the cornea and sclera.
- Tunica mucosa is the predominant Latin rendering of "mucous membrane" in English-speaking countries, though membrana mucosa also is acceptable and in some European languages is preferred. The name may be qualified in referring to particular regions of the body, such as tunica mucosa oris for the oral mucosa, and tunica mucosa uteri for the endometrium.
- Tunica muscularis refers to muscular layers in the walls of hollow organs such as the gut, where they are required for peristalsis, and sometimes for sphincters.
- Tunica serosa is the serous membrane
- Tunica vaginalis is the serous covering of the testis within the scrotum.
- Tunica vasculosa could refer to any tunic rich in blood vessels. In human anatomy, it generally refers either to tunica vasculosa lentis or to tunica vasculosa testis
