= Tunica albuginea of testis =

Tissue surrounding the testicle

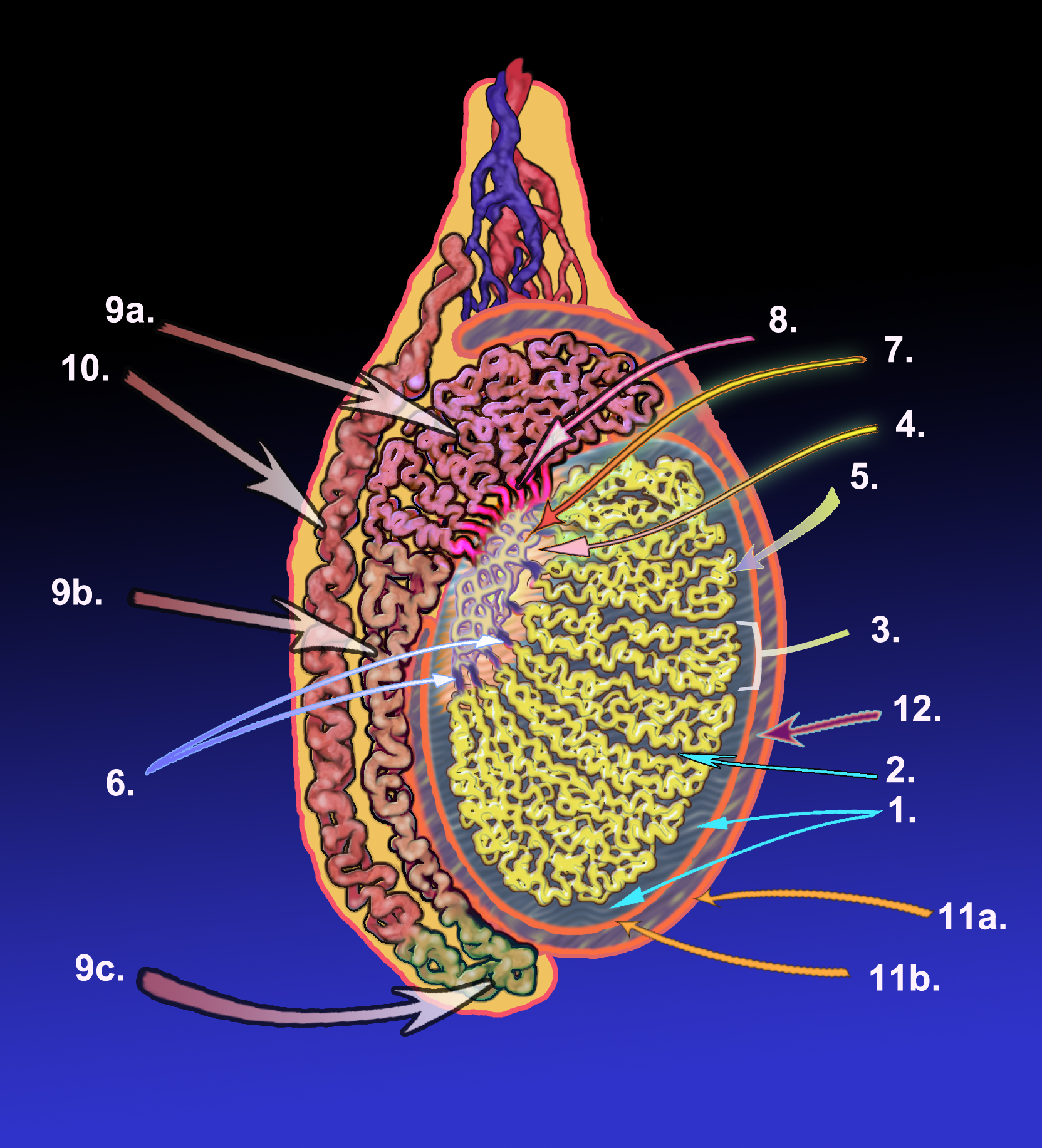
- A diagram of the major components of an adult human testicle, including the following numbered items: 1. Tunica albuginea, 2. Septula testis, 3. Lobulus testis, 4. Mediastinum testis, 5. Tubuli seminiferi contorti, 6. Tubuli seminiferi recti, 7. Rete testis, 8. Ductuli efferentes testis, 9a. Head of epididymis, 9b. Body of epididymis, 9c. Tail of epididymis, 10. Vas deferens, 11a. Tunica vaginalis (parietal lamina), 11b. Tunica vaginalis (visceral lamina), and 12. Cavity of tunica vaginalis.

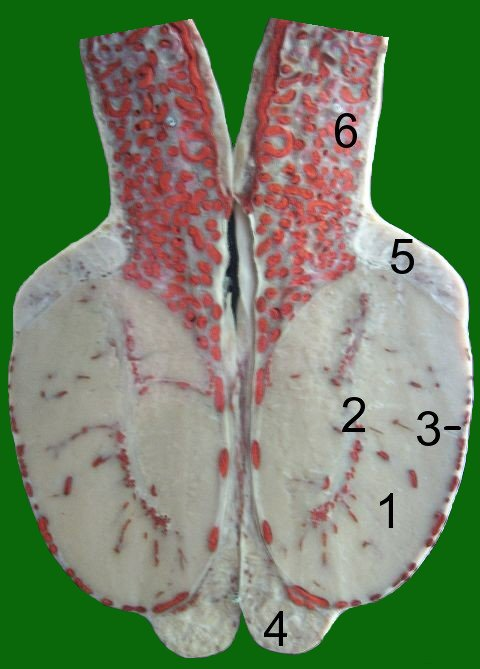
- Section of a testicle of a bull, blood vessels injected with red gelatine. 1 parenchyma, 2 mediastinum testis, 3 tunica albuginea, 4 tail of epididymis, 5 head of epididymis, 6 spermatic cord with convoluted testicular artery

Details

Identifiers
- Latin: tunica albuginea testis
- FMA: 19843

The tunica albuginea is a dense, blue-white layer of fibrous tissue surrounding the testis. It is the middle of three envelopes forming the capsule of the testis; it is deep to the visceral layer of tunica vaginalis, and superficial to the tunica vasculosa testis (vascular layer of testis).

The connective tissue of the tunica albuginea testis extends into the substance of the testis to form fibrous partitions - the septa testis. At the posterior aspect of the testis (where the serosa of testis is deficient to allow for the attachment of the epididymis), the tunica albuginea extends into the testis to form the mediastinum testis.

== Anatomy ==
It is thicker than the tunica albuginea of the ovary.

=== Histology ===
It is composed of bundles of white fibrous connective tissue (from which it derives its name albuginea) which interlace in every direction.

== Additional images ==
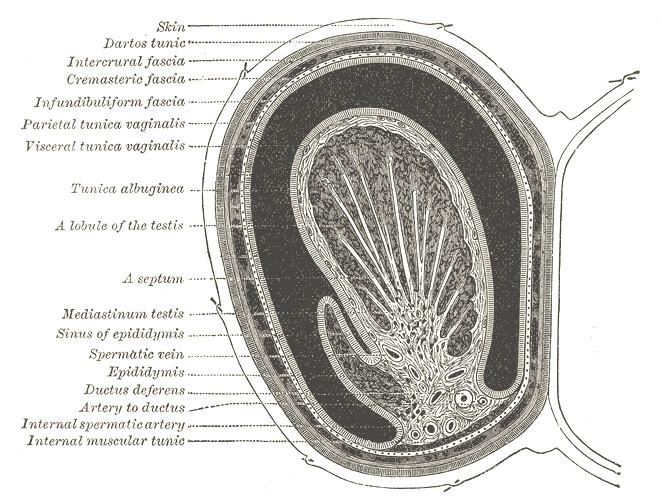
Transverse section through the left side of the scrotum and the left testis.

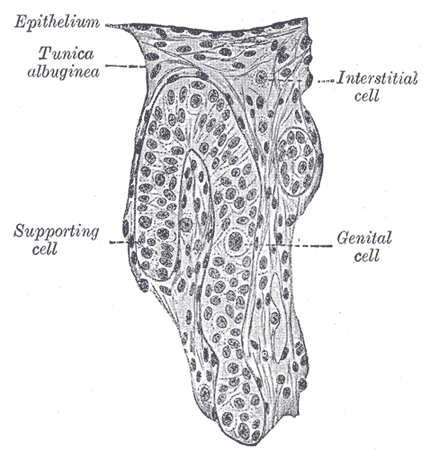
Section of a genital cord of the testis of a human embryo 3.5 cm. long.

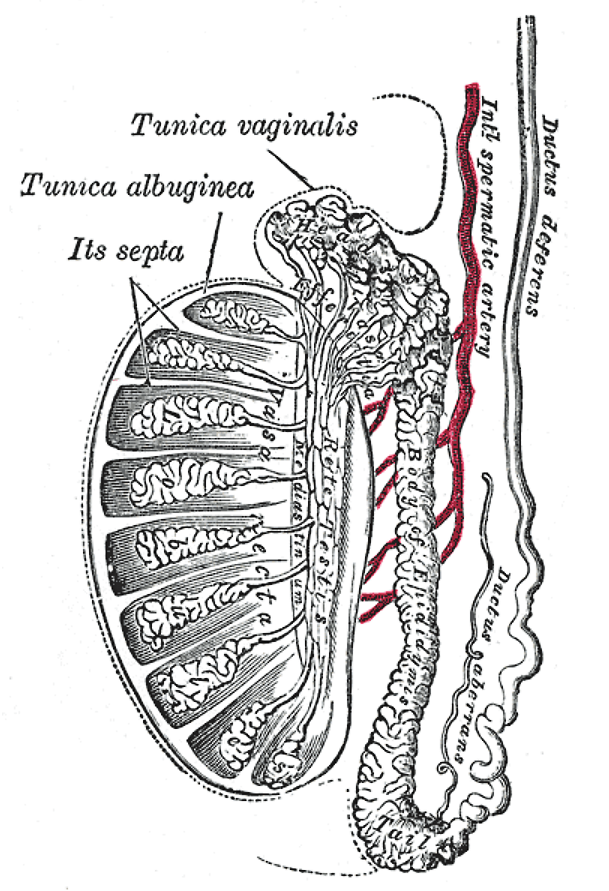
Vertical section of the testis, to show the arrangement of the ducts.
