= Tunica albuginea =

Tunica albuginea may refer to:

- Tunica albuginae (clitoris), the fibrous-elastic sheath of connective tissue that surrounds the shaft and glans of the clitoris
- Tunica albuginea oculi, the tough fibrous layer that covers most of the eyeball
- Tunica albuginea (ovaries), the connective tissue covering of the ovaries
- Tunica albuginea (penis), the tough fibrous layer of connective tissue that surrounds the corpora cavernosa of the penis
- Tunica albuginea (testicles), a layer of connective tissue covering the testicles

== See also ==
- Tunica (biology)
