= Appendix of the epididymis =

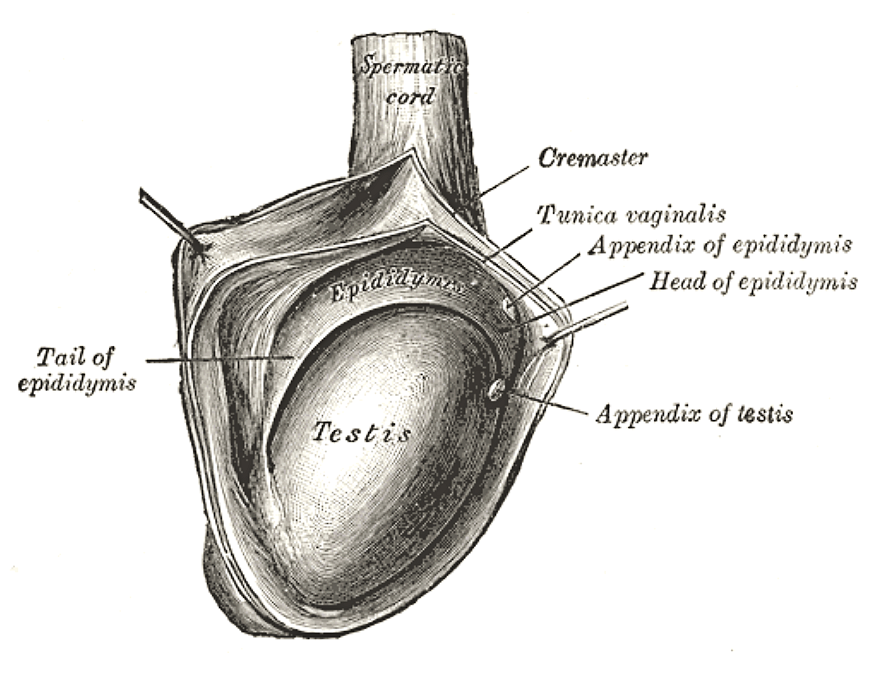
- The right testis, exposed by laying open the tunica vaginalis (appendix of epididymis labeled at center right)

Details
- Precursor: Wolffian duct

Identifiers
- Latin: appendix epididymidis

The appendix of the epididymis (or pedunculated hydatid) is a small stalked appendage (sometimes duplicated) on the head of the epididymis. It is usually regarded as a detached efferent duct.

This structure is derived from the Wolffian duct (mesonephric duct) as opposed to the appendix testis which is derived from the Müllerian duct (paramesonephric duct) remnant.

== See also ==
- Appendix testis
