= Mediastinum testis =

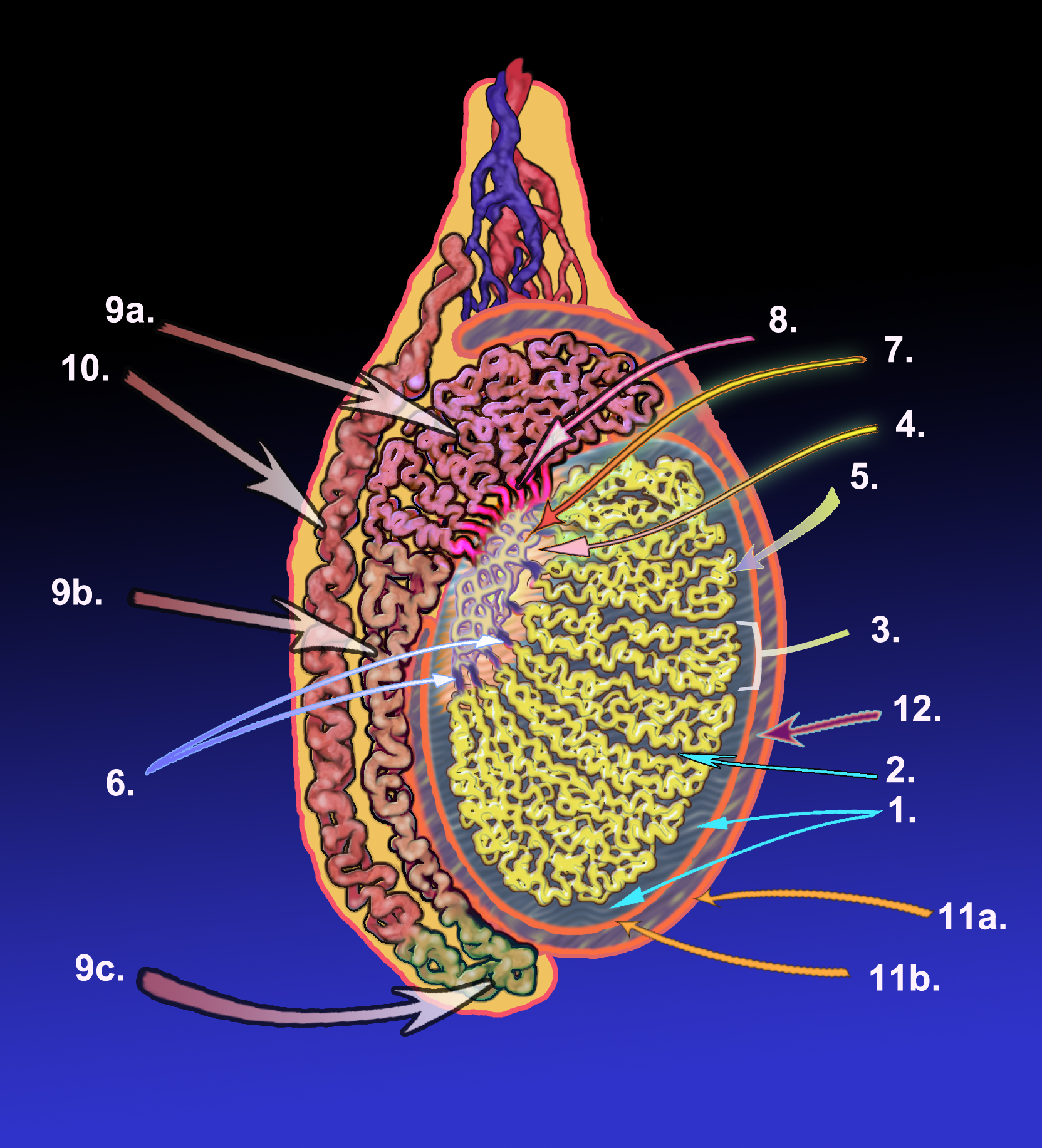
- A diagram of the major components of an adult human testicle, including the following numbered items: 1. Tunica albuginea, 2. Septula testis, 3. Lobulus testis, 4. Mediastinum testis, 5. Tubuli seminiferi contorti, 6. Tubuli seminiferi recti, 7. Rete testis, 8. Ductuli efferentes testis, 9a. Head of epididymis, 9b. Body of epididymis, 9c. Tail of epididymis, 10. Vas deferens, 11a. Tunica vaginalis (parietal lamina), 11b. Tunica vaginalis (visceral lamina), and 12. Cavity of tunica vaginalis.

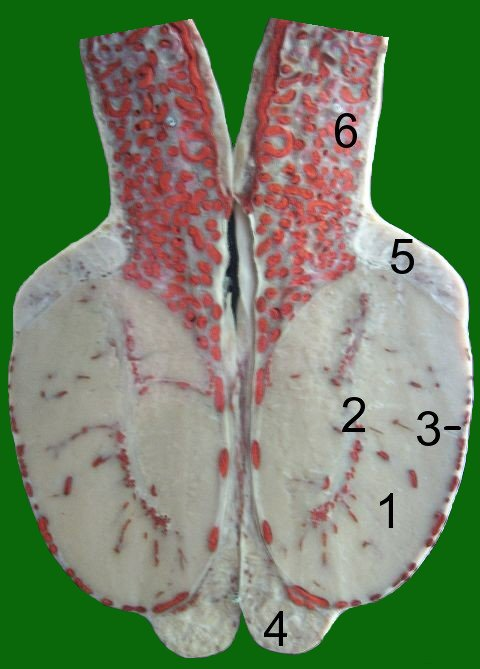
- Section of a testicle of a steer, blood vessels injected with red gelatine. 1 parenchyma, 2 mediastinum testis, 3 tunica albuginea, 4 tail of epididymis, 5 head of epididymis, 6 spermatic cord with convoluted testicular artery

Identifiers
- TA98: A09.3.01.018
- TA2: 3595

The mediastinum testis is a thick yet incomplete septum at the posterior part of the testis formed by the tunica albuginea of testis projecting into the testis at its posterior aspect where the testis is not lined by the serous membrane to allow for the attachment of the epididymis. It extends posteriorly between the testis' superior pole and inferior pole. It is wider superiorly than inferiorly. It supports the rete testis and blood and lymphatic vessels of the testis in their passage into and out of the substance of the gland.

The septa testis - extensions of the tunica albuginea into the substance of the testis that form fibrous partitions - converge towards the mediastinum testis.

== Additional images ==
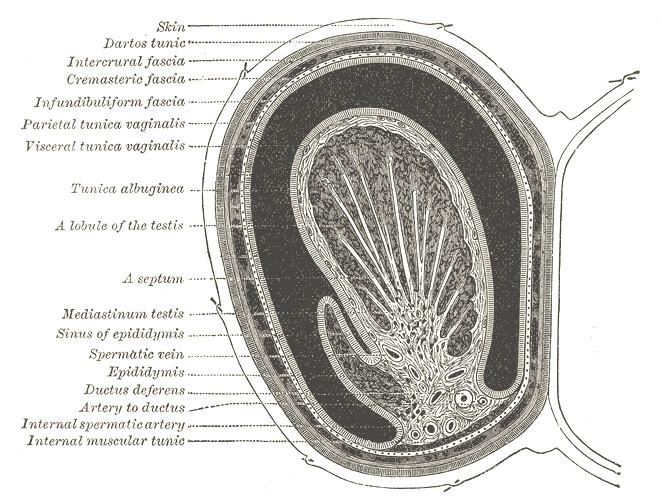
Transverse section through the left side of the scrotum and the left testis.

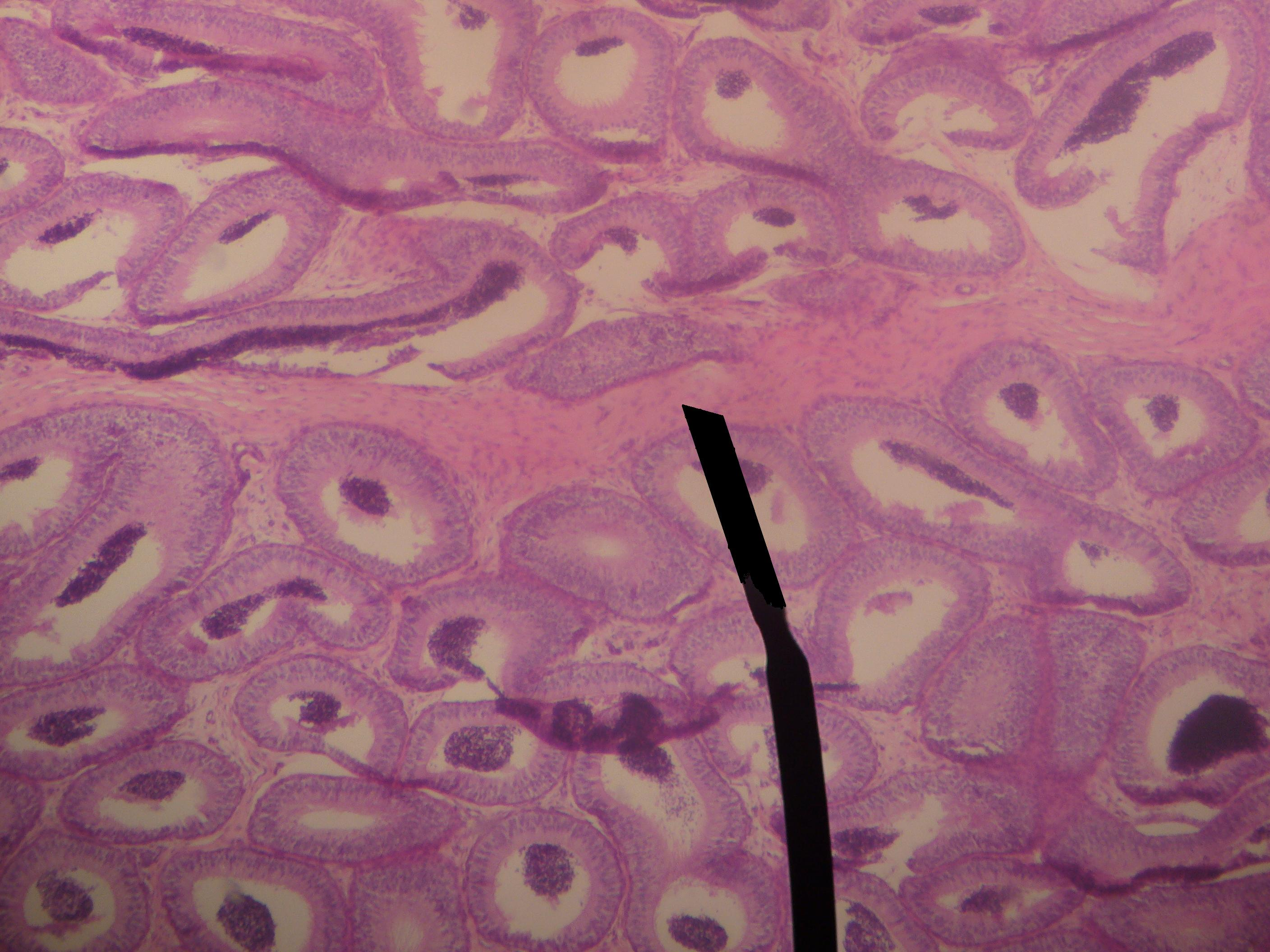
Microscopic picture.
