= Tubuli seminiferi recti =

Structures in the testicle

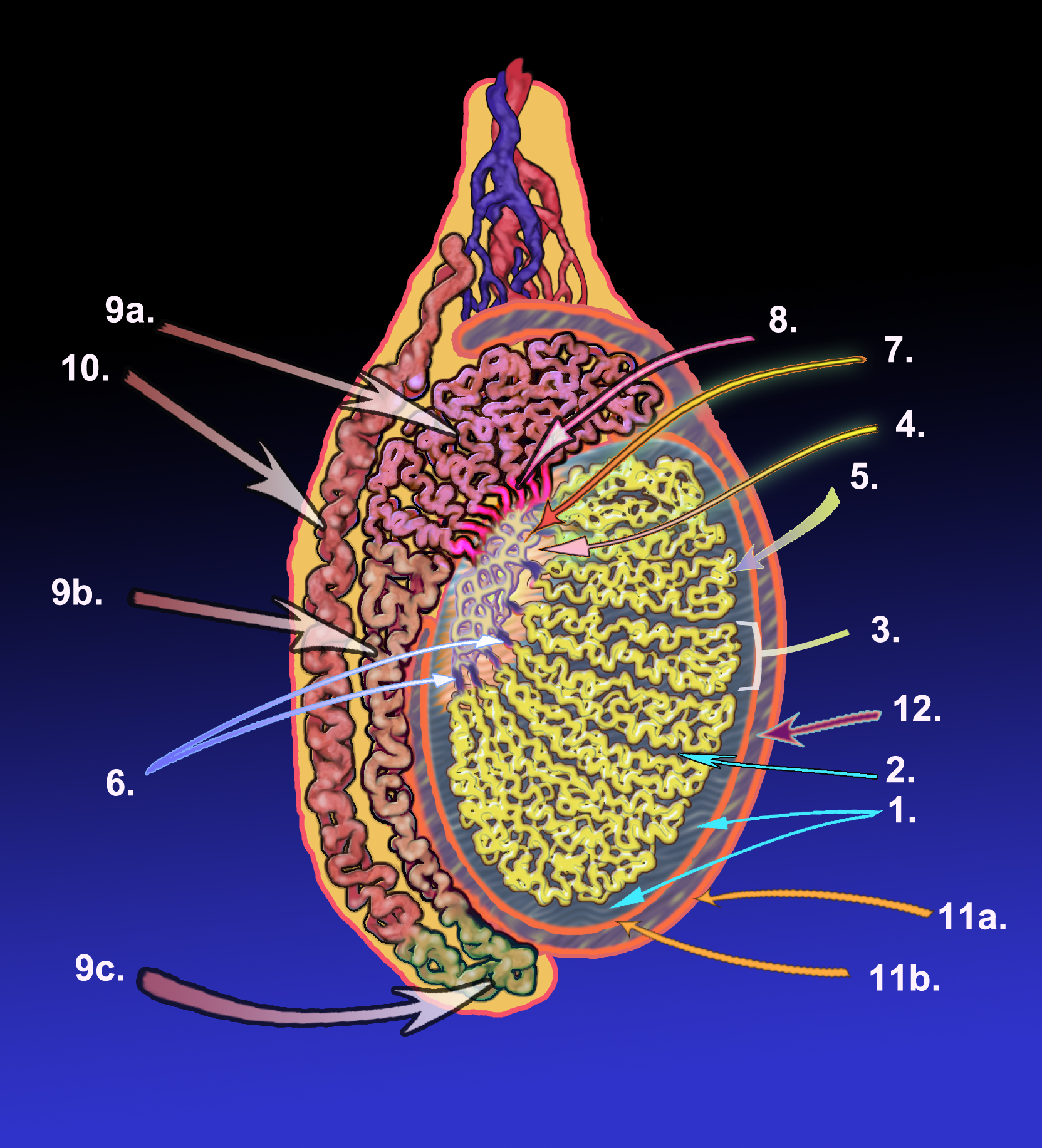
- A diagram of the major components of an adult human testicle, including the following numbered items: 1. Tunica albuginea, 2. Septula testis, 3. Lobulus testis, 4. Mediastinum testis, 5. Tubuli seminiferi contorti, 6. Tubuli seminiferi recti, 7. Rete testis, 8. Ductuli efferentes testis, 9a. Head of epididymis, 9b. Body of epididymis, 9c. Tail of epididymis, 10. Vas deferens, 11a. Tunica vaginalis (parietal lamina), 11b. Tunica vaginalis (visceral lamina), and 12. Cavity of tunica vaginalis.

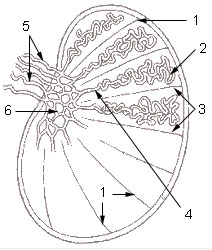
- 1: Testicular septa 2: Convoluted seminiferous tubules 3: Testicular lobules 4: Straight seminiferous tubules 5: Efferent ductules 6: Rete testis

Details

Identifiers
- Latin: tubuli seminiferi recti, tubulus rectus

The tubuli seminiferi recti (also known as the tubuli recti, tubulus rectus, or straight seminiferous tubules) are structures in the testicle connecting the convoluted region of the seminiferous tubules to the rete testis, although the tubuli recti have a different appearance distinguishing them from these two structures.

They enter the fibrous tissue of the mediastinum testis, and pass upward and backward, forming, in their ascent, a close network of anastomosing tubes which are merely channels in the fibrous stroma, lined by flattened epithelium, and having no proper walls; this constitutes the rete testis. Only Sertoli cells line the terminal ends of the seminiferous tubules (tubuli recti).
