= Septa of testis =

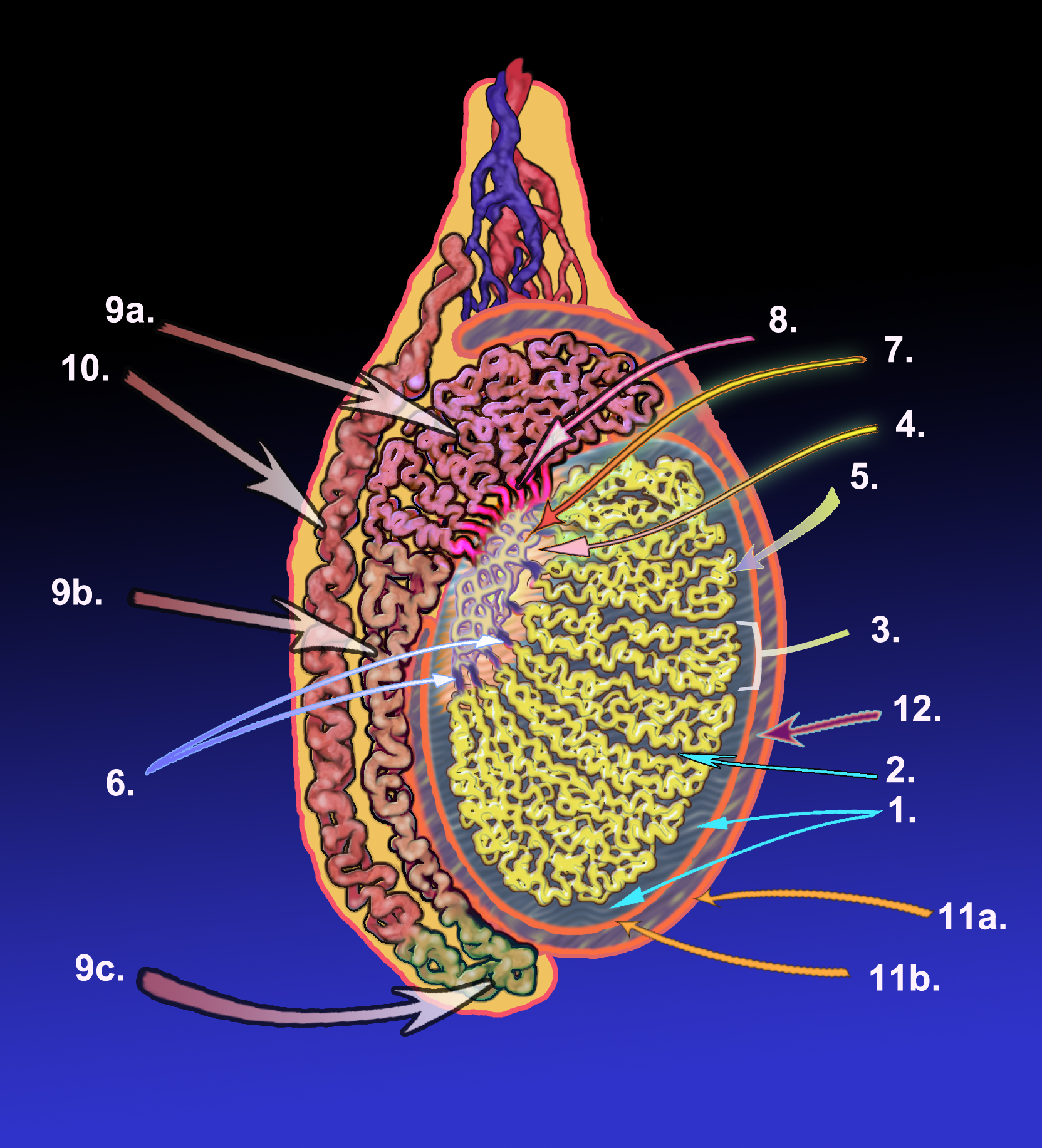
- A diagram of the major components of an adult human testicle, including the following numbered items: 1. Tunica albuginea, 2. Septula testis, 3. Lobulus testis, 4. Mediastinum testis, 5. Tubuli seminiferi contorti, 6. Tubuli seminiferi recti, 7. Rete testis, 8. Ductuli efferentes testis, 9a. Head of epididymis, 9b. Body of epididymis, 9c. Tail of epididymis, 10. Vas deferens, 11a. Tunica vaginalis (parietal lamina), 11b. Tunica vaginalis (visceral lamina), and 12. Cavity of tunica vaginalis.

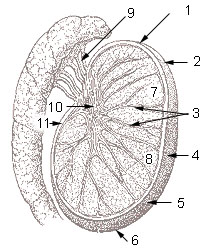
- 1: Head or upper pole of testis, 2: Tunica albuginea, 3: Testicular septa, 4: Anterior margin (free margin), 5: Lateral surface, 6: Tail or lower pole of testis, 7: Testicular lobules, 8: Parenchyma of testis, 9: Efferent ductules, 10: Mediastinum testis, 11: Posterior margin

Details

Identifiers
- Latin: septula testis
- TA98: A09.3.01.019
- TA2: 3596
- FMA: 19814

The septa testis are fibrous partitions of the testis dividing the testis into compartments - the lobules of the testis. The septa are formed by extensions of the tunica albuginea - the dense fibrous connective tissue surface covering of the testis - into the substance of the testis. The septa converge towards the mediastinum testis.

== Additional images ==
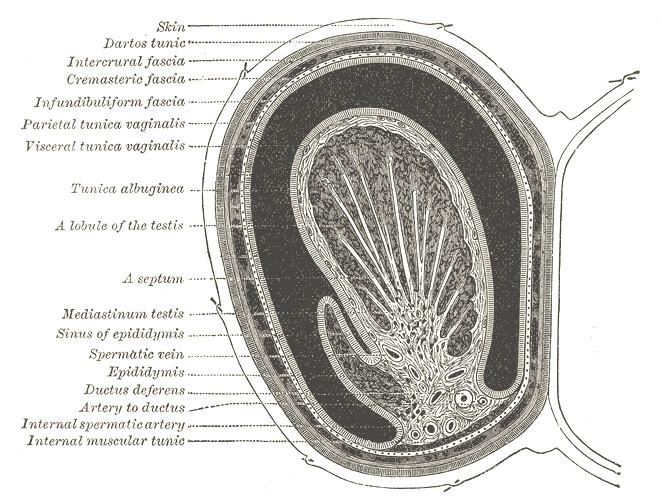
Transverse section through the left side of the scrotum and the left testis.

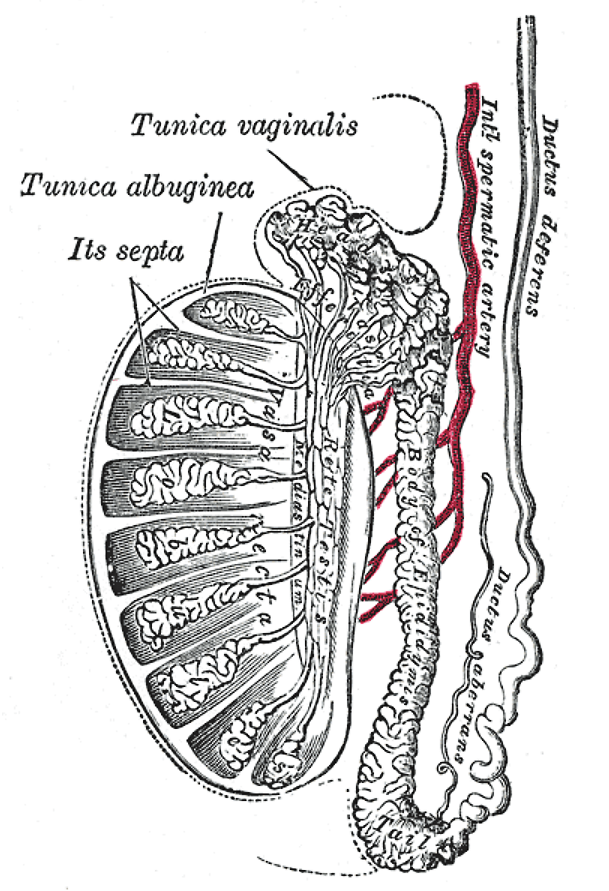
Vertical section of the testis, to show the arrangement of the ducts.
