= Tunica vasculosa =

Tunica vasculosa can refer to:

- Tunica vasculosa lentis
- Tunica vasculosa testis
- Tunica vasculosa bulbi
