= Tunick =

Tunick is a Jewish surname, a variant of Tunik.

Notable people with the surname include:

- Irving "Irve" Tunick (1912-1987), American filmmaker
- Jonathan Tunick, American orchestrator, musical director, and composer
- Spencer Tunick, American photographer
