= Tunica vasculosa testis =

Vascular layer of the testis

Details

Identifiers
- Latin: tunica vasculosa testis

The tunica vasculosa testis (vascular layer of testis) is the inner-most of the three layers that form the capsule of the testis. It consists of a vascular plexus and loose connective tissue. It extends into the testis itself to line the surfaces of individual septa of testis.
