= Rete testis =

Tubules that carry sperm

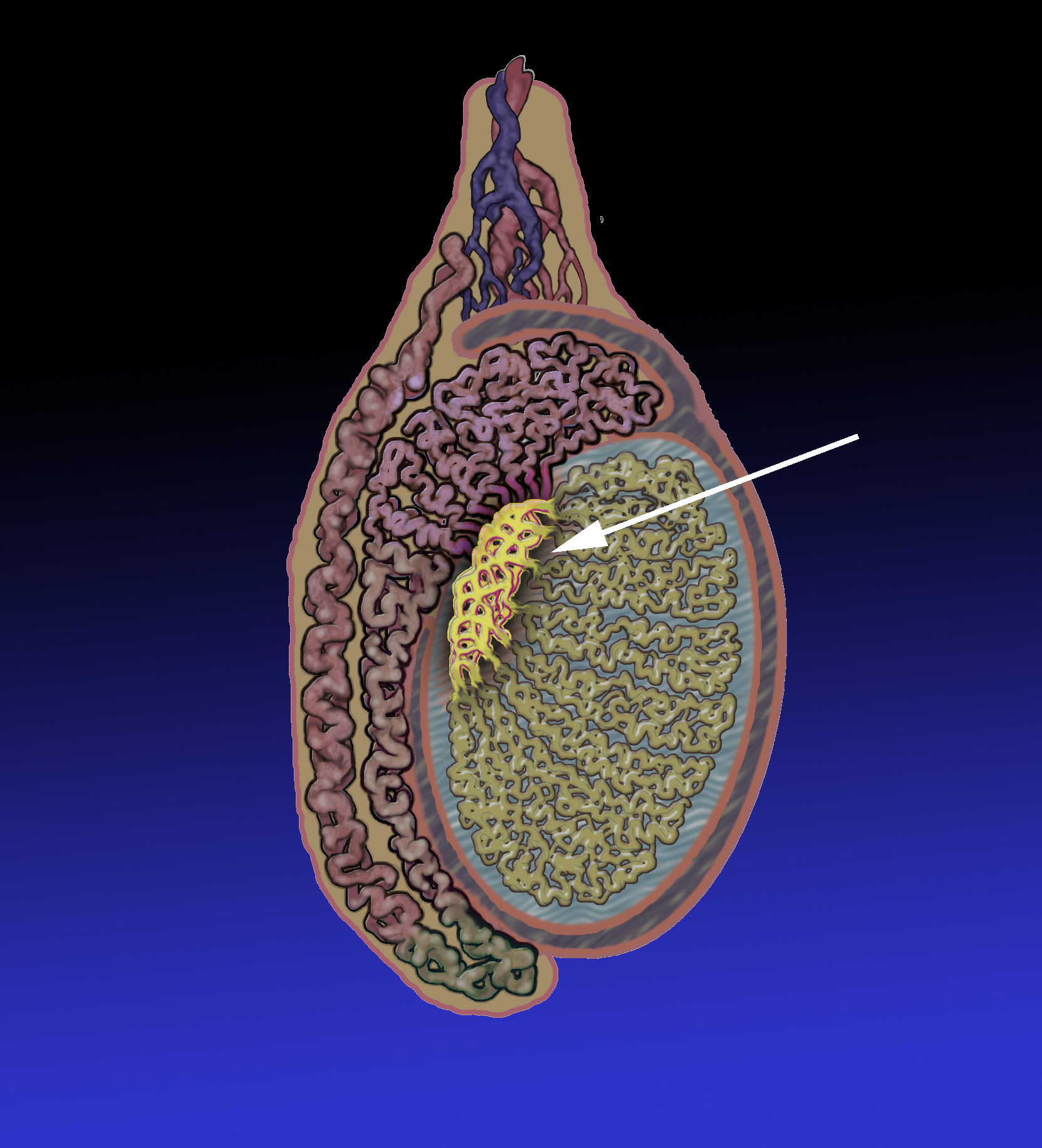
- Position of the rete testis within the testicle

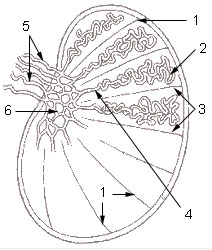
- 1: Testicular septa 2: Convoluted seminiferous tubules 3: Testicular lobules 4: Straight seminiferous tubules 5: Efferent ductules 6: Rete testis

Details
- Precursor: Wolffian duct

Identifiers
- Latin: rete testis
- MeSH: D012152
- TA98: A09.3.01.024
- TA2: 3601
- FMA: 19834

The rete testis (/ˈriːti ˈtɛstɪs/ REE-tee TES-tis; pl.: retia testes) is an anastomosing network of delicate tubules located in the hilum of the testicle (mediastinum testis) that carries sperm from the seminiferous tubules to the efferent ducts. It is the homologue of the rete ovarii in females. Its function is to provide a site for fluid reabsorption.

== Structure ==
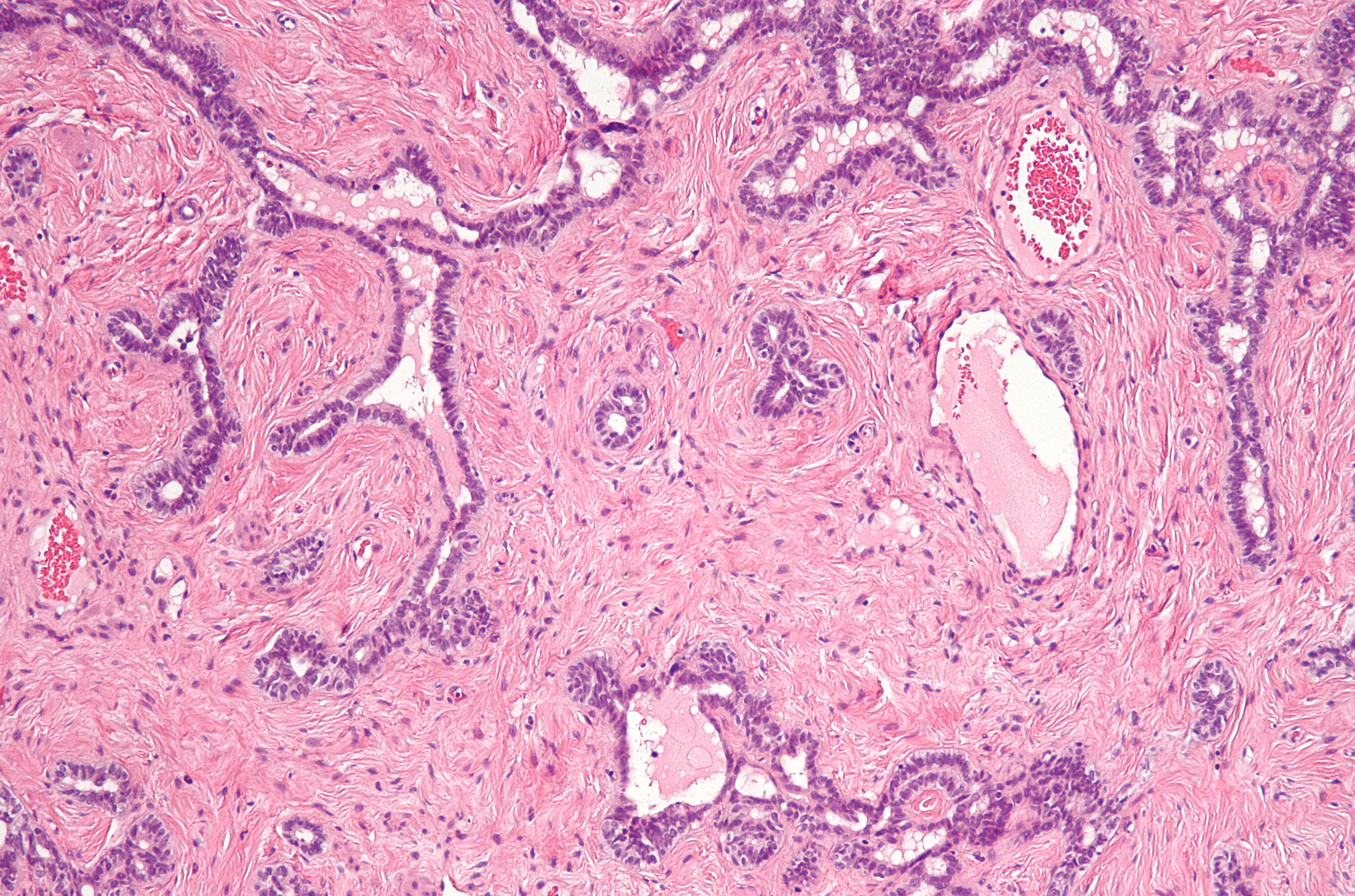
Micrograph of the rete testis. H&E stain.

The rete testis is the network of interconnecting tubules where the straight seminiferous tubules (the terminal part of the seminiferous tubules) empty. It is located within a highly vascular connective tissue in the mediastinum testis. The epithelial cells form a single layer that lines the inner surface of the tubules. These cells are cuboidal, with microvilli and a single cilium on their surface.

=== Development ===
In the development of the urinary and reproductive organs, the testis is developed in much the same way as the ovary, originating from mesothelium as well as mesonephros. Like the ovary, in its earliest stages it consists of a central mass covered by a surface epithelium. In the central mass, a series of cords appear. These cords run together toward the future hilum and form a network that ultimately becomes the rete testis.

== Function ==
It appears the function of the rete testis is to mix the sperm as they leave the seminiferous tubules. Sperm leave the seminiferous tubules in the dilute secretions of Sertoli cells. The rete testis does modify the luminal fluids with a limited amount of secretion and reabsorption, but their primary function is to mix and transport the sperm into the efferent ductules, where the major function is reabsorption of about 95% of the fluid, which increases the sperm concentration prior to entering the epididymis.

== Clinical significance ==
Rete tubular ectasia is a disorder of the rete testis characterized by multiple benign cysts.

== Etymology ==
English uses the Neo-Latin name for the structure, which simply means "network of the testis".

== Additional images ==
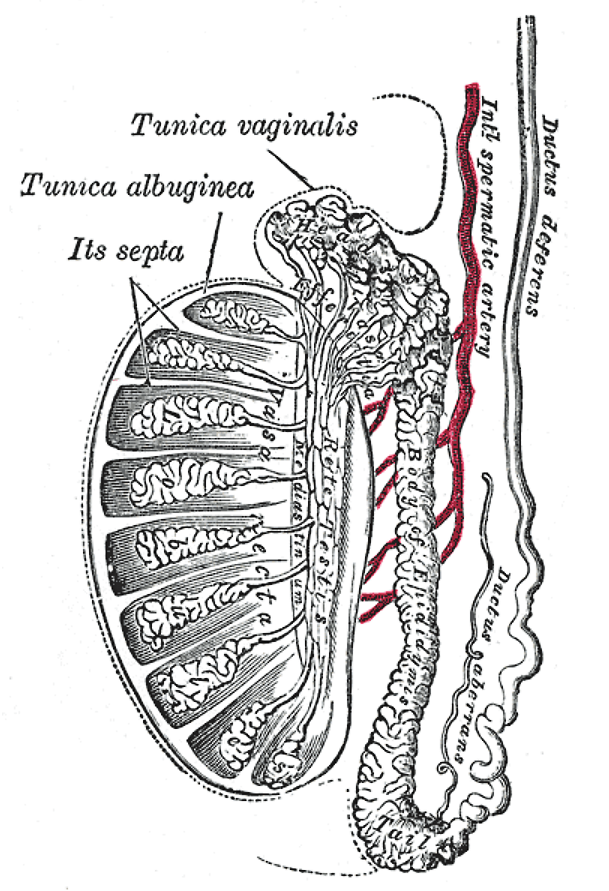
Vertical section of the testis, to show the arrangement of the ducts.

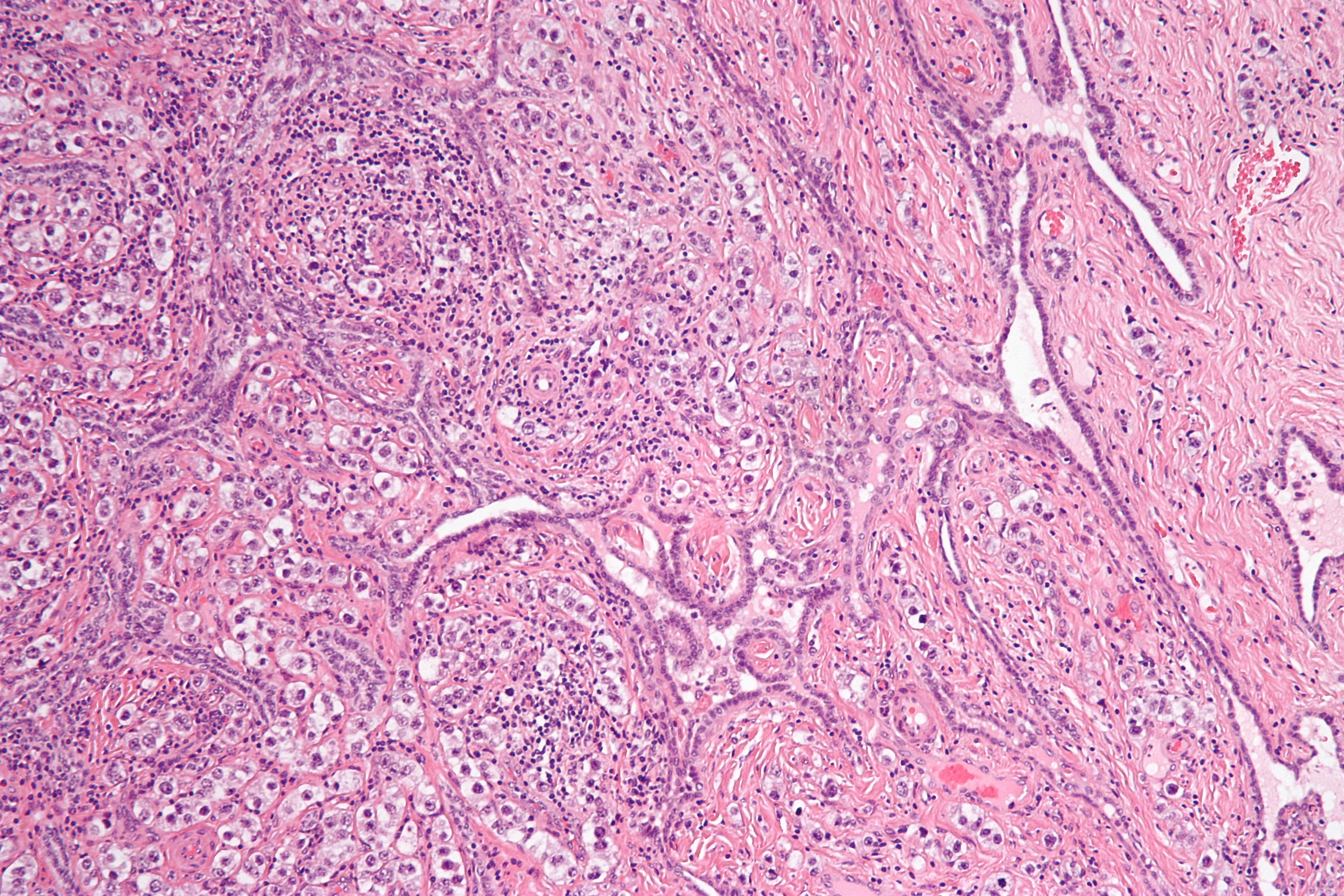
Micrograph of the rete testis involved by seminoma. H&E stain.

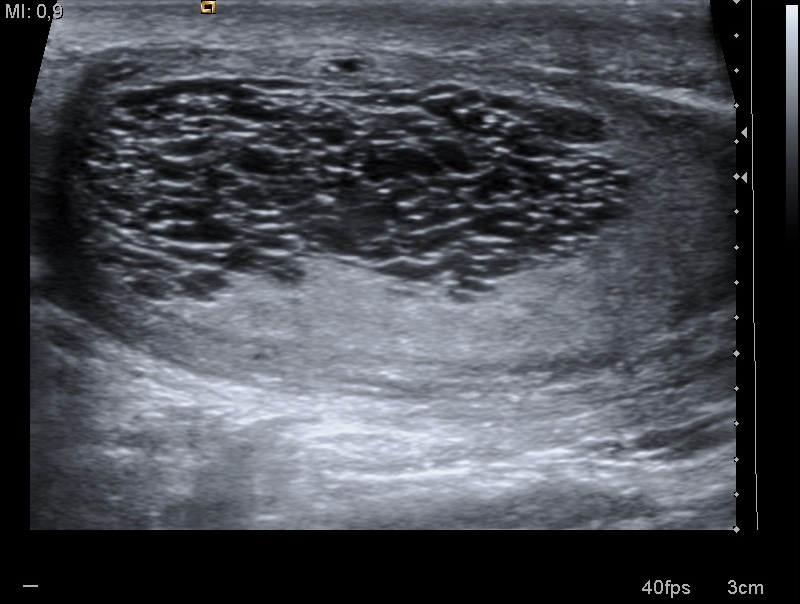
Tubular ectasia of the rete testis
