= Testicle =

Internal organ in the male reproductive system

- Diagram of inner structures of a human testicle (the labelling "seminal vesicle lobules" is incorrect and should be "testicular lobules" instead)

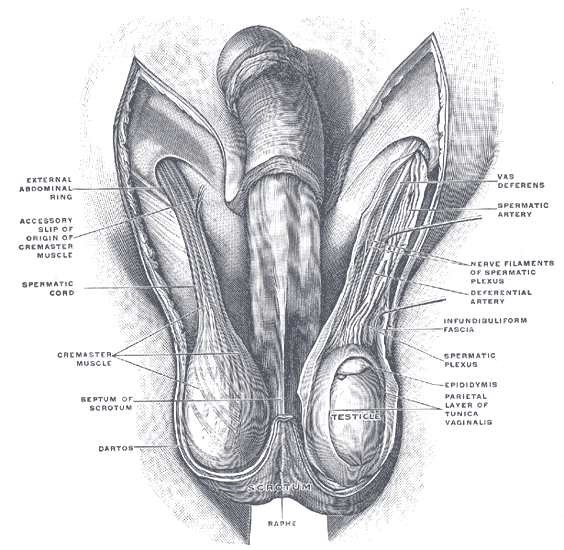
- Diagram of the external features and surrounding structures of the testicles of an adult male

Details
- Artery: Testicular artery
- Vein: Testicular vein, pampiniform plexus
- Nerve: Spermatic plexus
- Lymph: Lumbar lymph nodes

Identifiers
- Latin: testis
- MeSH: D013737
- TA98: A09.3.01.001
- TA2: 3576
- FMA: 7210

Animation of the migration of spermatozoa from their origin as germ cells to their exit from the vas deferens. A) Blood vessels; B) Head of epididymis; C) Efferent ductules; D) Seminiferous tubules; E) Parietal lamina of tunica vaginalis; F) Visceral lamina of tunica vaginalis; G) Cavity of tunica vaginalis; H) Tunica albuginea; I) Lobule of testis; J) Tail of epididymis; K) Body of epididymis; L) Mediastinum testis; M) Vas deferens.

A testicle, also called testis (pl. testes) is the male gonad in all gonochoric animals, including humans, and is homologous to the ovary, which is the female gonad. Its primary functions are the production of sperm and the secretion of androgens, primarily testosterone.

The release of testosterone is regulated by luteinizing hormone (LH) from the anterior pituitary gland. Sperm production is controlled by follicle-stimulating hormone (FSH) from the anterior pituitary gland and by testosterone produced within the gonads.

== Structure ==
=== Appearance ===
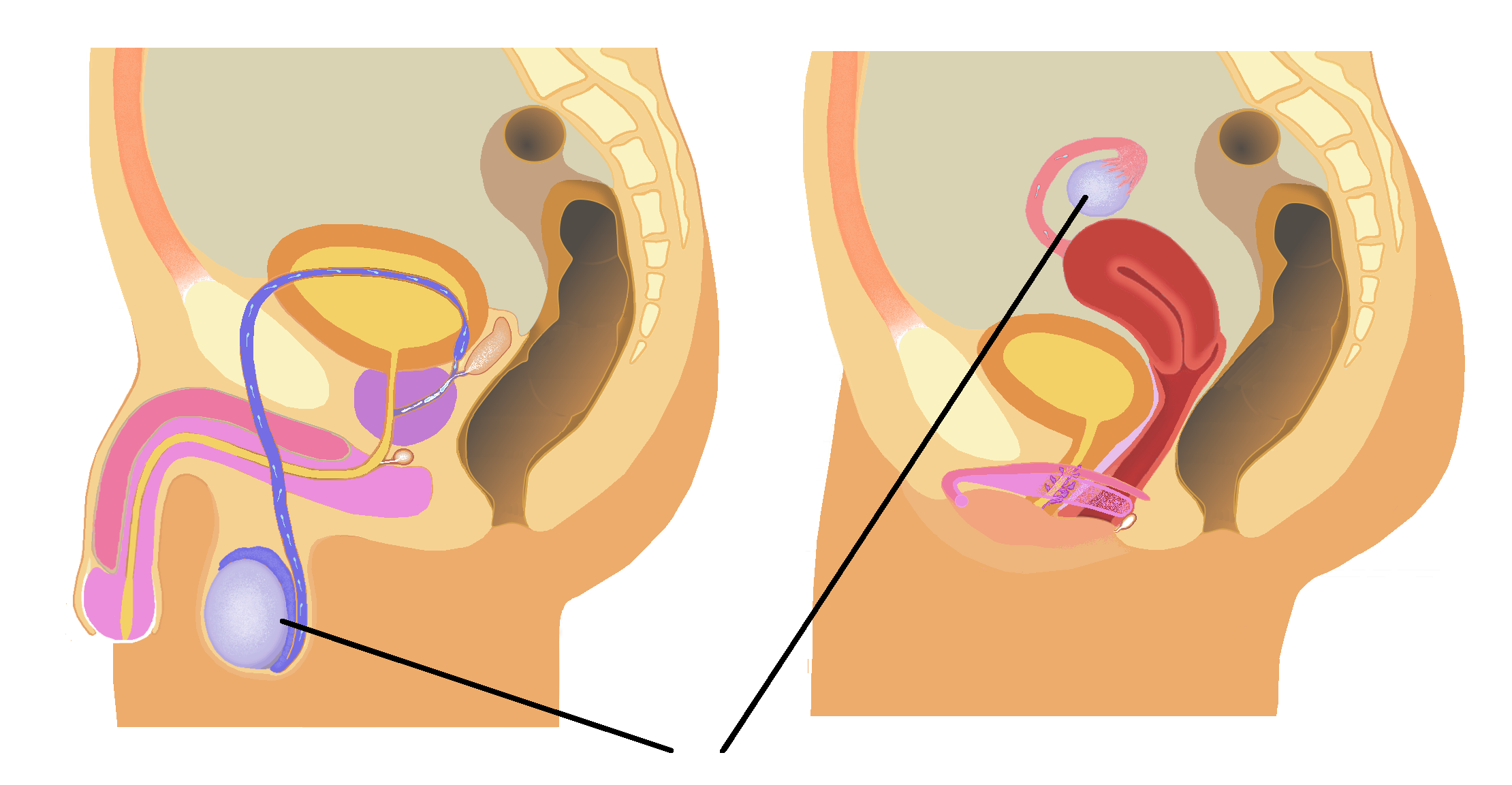
Male gonad (testes, left) and female gonad (ovaries, right)

Male humans have two testicles of similar size contained within the scrotum, which is an extension of the abdominal wall. Scrotal asymmetry, in which one testicle extends farther down into the scrotum than the other, is common. This is because of the differences in the vasculature's anatomy. For 85% of men, the right testis hangs lower than the left one.

=== Measurement and volume ===
The volume of the testicle can be estimated by palpating it and comparing it to ellipsoids (an orchidometer) of known sizes. Another method is to use calipers, a ruler, or an ultrasound image to obtain the three measurements of the x, y, and z axes (length, depth and width). These measurements can then be used to calculate the volume, using the formula for the volume of an ellipsoid:

$$Volume = \frac{4}{3} \cdot \pi \cdot \frac{length}{2} \cdot \frac{width}{2} \cdot \frac{depth}{2}$$
$$\approx length \cdot width \cdot depth \cdot 0.52$$

However, the most accurate calculation of actual testicular volume is gained from the formula:

$$\approx length \cdot width \cdot depth \cdot 0.71$$

An average adult testicle measures up to 5 cm × 2 cm × 3 cm (2 in × 3/4 in × 1 1/4 in). The Tanner scale, which is used to assess the maturity of the male genitalia, assigns a maturity stage to the calculated volume ranging from stage I, a volume of less than 1.5 cm^{3}; to stage V, a volume greater than 20 cm^{3}. Normal volume is 15 to 25 cm^{3}; the average is 18 cm^{3} per testis (range 12–30 cm^{3}).

The number of spermatozoa an adult human male produces is directly proportional to testicular volume, as larger testicles contain more seminiferous tubules and Sertoli cells as a result. As such, men with larger testicles produce on average more sperm cells in each ejaculate, as testicular volume is positively correlated with semen profiles.

=== Internal structure ===
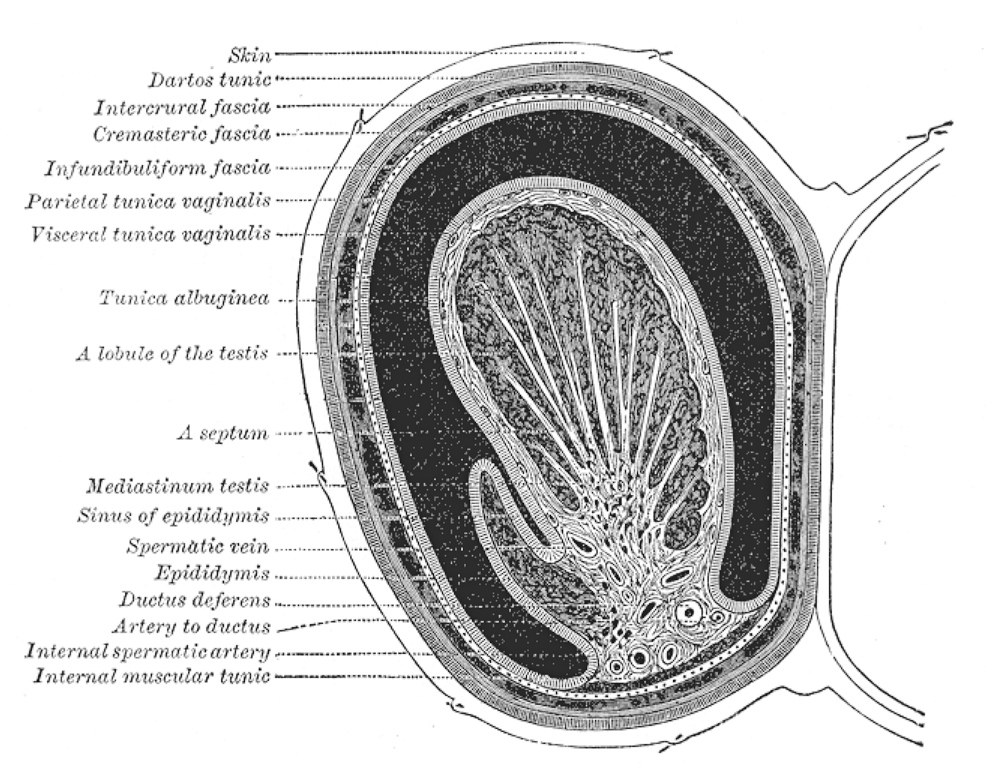
Transverse section through the left side of the scrotum and the left testis

==== Duct system ====
The testes are covered by a tough fibrous shell called the tunica albuginea. Under the tunica albuginea, the testes contain very fine-coiled tubes called seminiferous tubules. The tubules are lined with a layer of cells (germ cells) that develop from puberty through old age into sperm cells (also known as spermatozoa or male gametes). The developing sperm travel through the seminiferous tubules to the rete testis located in the mediastinum testis, to the efferent ducts, and then to the epididymis where newly created sperm cells mature (spermatogenesis). The sperm move into the vas deferens, and are eventually expelled through the urethra and out of the urethral orifice through muscular contractions.

==== Primary cell types ====
Within the seminiferous tubules, the germ cells develop into spermatogonia, spermatocytes, spermatids and spermatozoa through the process of spermatogenesis. The gametes contain DNA for fertilization of an ovum. Sertoli cells are the true epithelium of the seminiferous epithelium, critical for the support of germ cell development into spermatozoa. Sertoli cells secrete inhibin, a hormone that plays a crucial role in regulating spermatogenesis by inhibiting the secretion of FSH from the pituitary gland, thus helping to regulate sperm production. Peritubular myoid cells surround the seminiferous tubules.

Between the seminiferous tubules are interstitial cells called Leydig cells that produce and secrete testosterone and other androgens important for puberty (including secondary sexual characteristics like facial hair), sexual behavior, and libido. Testosterone controls testicular volume.

Immature Leydig cells and interstitial macrophages and epithelial cells are also present.

==== Blood supply and lymphatic drainage ====
The testis has three sources of arterial blood supply: the testicular artery, the cremasteric artery, and the artery to the ductus deferens. Blood supply and lymphatic drainage of the testes and scrotum are distinct:

- The paired testicular arteries arise directly from the abdominal aorta and descend through the inguinal canal, while the scrotum and the rest of the external genitalia is supplied by the internal pudendal artery (a branch of the internal iliac artery).
- The testis has collateral blood supply from the cremasteric artery (a branch of the inferior epigastric artery, which is a branch of the external iliac artery), and the artery to the ductus deferens (a branch of the inferior vesical artery, which is a branch of the internal iliac artery). Therefore, if the testicular artery is ligated, e.g., during a Fowler-Stevens orchiopexy for a high undescended testis, the testis will usually survive on these other blood supplies.
- Lymphatic drainage of the testes follows the testicular arteries back to the paraaortic lymph nodes, while lymph from the scrotum drains to the inguinal lymph nodes.

==== Layers ====
3D anatomy of the layers surrounding the testis

Many anatomical features of the adult testis reflect its developmental origin in the abdomen. The layers of tissue enclosing each testicle are derived from the layers of the anterior abdominal wall. The cremasteric muscle arises from the internal oblique muscle.

==== The blood–testis barrier ====
Large molecules cannot pass from the blood into the lumen of a seminiferous tubule due to the presence of tight junctions between adjacent Sertoli cells. The spermatogonia occupy the basal compartment (deep to the level of the tight junctions) and the more mature forms, such as primary and secondary spermatocytes and spermatids, occupy the adluminal compartment.

The function of the blood–testis barrier may be to prevent an auto-immune reaction. Mature sperm (and their antigens) emerge significantly after immune tolerance is set in infancy. Since sperm are antigenically different from self-tissue, a male animal can react immunologically to his own sperm. The male can make antibodies against them.

Injection of sperm antigens causes inflammation of the testis (auto-immune orchitis) and reduced fertility. The blood–testis barrier may reduce the likelihood that sperm proteins will induce an immune response.

=== Temperature regulation and responses ===
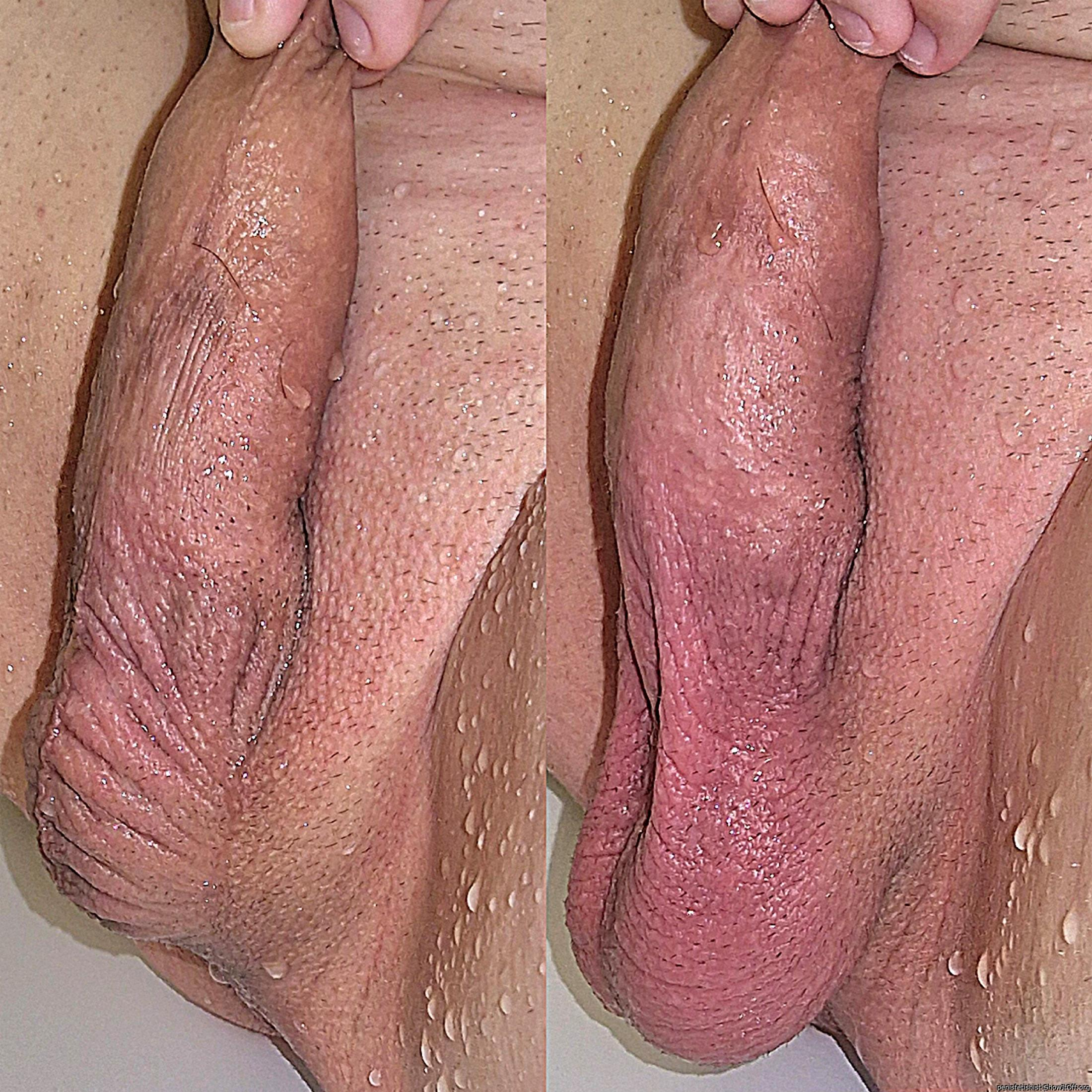
Temperature regulation as seen by the human testicles and scrotum. The testicles are pulled when exposed to cold water[left] and are let go when exposed to hot water[right].

Carl Richard Moore in 1926 proposed that testicles were external due to spermatogenesis being enhanced at temperatures slightly less than core body temperature outside the body. The spermatogenesis is less efficient at lower and higher temperatures than 33 °C. Because the testes are located outside the body, the smooth tissue of the scrotum can move them closer or further away from the body. The temperature of the testes is maintained at 34.4 °C, a little below body temperature, as temperatures above 36.7 °C impede spermatogenesis. There are a number of mechanisms to maintain the testes at the optimum temperature.

The cremasteric muscle covers the testicles and the spermatic cord. When this muscle contracts, the cord shortens and the testicles move closer up toward the body, which provides slightly more warmth to maintain optimal testicular temperature. When cooling is required, the cremasteric muscle relaxes and the testicles lower away from the warm body and are able to cool. Contraction also occurs in response to physical stress, such as blunt trauma; the testicles withdraw and the scrotum shrinks very close to the body in an effort to protect them.

The cremasteric reflex will reflexively raise the testicles. The testicles can also be lifted voluntarily using the pubococcygeus muscle, which partially activates related muscles.

=== Gene and protein expression ===
The human genome includes approximately 20,000 protein coding genes: 80% of these genes are expressed in adult testes. The testes have the highest fraction of tissue type-specific genes compared to other organs and tissues. About 1000 of them are highly specific for the testes, and about 2,200 show an elevated pattern of expression. A majority of these genes encode for proteins that are expressed in the seminiferous tubules and have functions related to spermatogenesis. Sperm cells express proteins that result in the development of flagella; these same proteins are expressed in the female in cells lining the fallopian tube and cause the development of cilia. Sperm cell flagella and fallopian tube cilia are homologous structures. The testis-specific proteins that show the highest level of expression are protamines.

== Development ==
There are two phases in which the testes grow substantially. These are the embryonic and pubertal phases. During mammalian development, the gonads are at first capable of becoming either ovaries or testes. In humans, starting at about week 4, the gonadal rudiments are present within the intermediate mesoderm adjacent to the developing kidneys. At about week 6, sex cords develop within the forming testes. These are made up of early Sertoli cells that surround and nurture the germ cells that migrate into the gonads shortly before sex determination begins. In males, the sex-specific gene SRY that is found on the Y chromosome initiates sex determination by downstream regulation of sex-determining factors (such as GATA4, SOX9 and AMH), which lead to development of the male phenotype, including directing development of the early bipotential gonad toward the male path of development.

Testes follow the path of descent, from high in the posterior fetal abdomen to the inguinal ring and beyond to the inguinal canal and into the scrotum. In most cases (97% full-term, 70% preterm), both testes have descended by birth. In most other cases, only one testis fails to descend. This is called cryptorchidism. In most cases of cryptorchidism, the issue will mostly resolve itself within the first half year of life. However, if the testes do not descend far enough into the scrotum, surgical anchoring in the scrotum is required due to risks of infertility and testicular cancer.

The testes grow in response to the start of spermatogenesis. Size depends on lytic function, sperm production (amount of spermatogenesis present in testis), interstitial fluid, and Sertoli cell fluid production. The testicles are fully descended before the male reaches puberty.

== Clinical significance ==
=== Protection and injury ===
- The testicles are very sensitive to impact and injury. The pain involved travels up from each testicle into the abdominal cavity, via the spermatic plexus, which is the primary nerve of each testicle. This will cause pain in the hip and the back. The pain usually fades within a few minutes.
- Testicular torsion is a medical emergency. This is because the longer it takes to access medical intervention with respect to extending ischemia, the higher the chance that the testicle will be lost. There is a 90% chance to save the testicle if de-torsion surgery is performed within six hours of testicular torsion onset.
- Testicular rupture is severe trauma affecting the tunica albuginea.
- Penetrating injuries to the scrotum may cause castration, or physical separation or destruction of the testes, possibly along with part or all of the penis, which results in total sterility if the testicles are not reattached quickly. In an effort to avoid severe infection, ample application of saline and bacitracin help remove debris and foreign objects from the wound.
- Jockstraps support and protect the testicles.

=== Diseases and conditions ===
Testicular disease
- Specialty: Urology, Reproductive medicine

- To improve the chances of identifying cases of testicular cancer, neoplasms, and other health issues early, regular testicular self-examination is recommended.
- Varicocele, swollen vein(s) from the testes, usually affecting the left side, the testis usually being normal.
- Hydrocele testis is swelling around testes caused by accumulation of clear liquid within a membranous sac, the testis usually being normal. It is the most common cause of scrotal swelling.
- Spermatocele is a retention cyst of a tubule of the rete testis or the head of the epididymis distended with barely watery fluid that contains spermatozoa.
- Endocrine disorders can also affect the size and function of the testis.
- Certain inherited conditions involving mutations in key developmental genes also impair testicular descent, resulting in abdominal or inguinal testes, which remain nonfunctional and may become cancerous. Other genetic conditions can result in the loss of the Wolffian ducts and allow for the persistence of Müllerian ducts. Both excess and deficient levels of estrogens can disrupt spermatogenesis and cause infertility.
- Bell-clapper deformity is a deformity in which the testicle is not attached to the scrotal walls, and can rotate freely on the spermatic cord within the tunica vaginalis. Those with Bell-clapper are at a higher risk of testicular torsion.
- Orchitis is inflammation of the testicles
- Epididymitis is a painful inflammation of the epididymis or epididymides, frequently caused by bacterial infection but sometimes of unknown origin.
- Anorchia is the absence of one or both testicles.
- Cryptorchidism, or "undescended testicles", is when the testicle does not descend into the scrotum of an infant boy.
- Testicular enlargement is an unspecific sign of various testicular diseases, and can be defined as a testicular size of more than 5 cm (long axis) × 3 cm (short axis).
- Blue balls is a condition concerning temporary fluid congestion in the testicles and prostate region, caused by prolonged sexual arousal.

Testicular prostheses are available to mimic the appearance and feel of one or both testicles, when absent as from injury or as treatment in association to gender dysphoria. There have also been some instances of their implantation in dogs.

Scientists are working on developing lab-grown testicles that might help infertile men in the future.

=== Effects of exogenous hormones ===
To some extent, it is possible to change testicular size. Short of direct injury or subjecting them to adverse conditions, e.g., higher temperature than they are normally accustomed to, they can be shrunk by competing against their intrinsic hormonal function through the use of externally administered steroidal hormones. Steroids taken for muscle enhancement (especially anabolic steroids) often have the undesired side effect of testicular shrinkage.

Stimulation of testicular functions via gonadotropic-like hormones may enlarge their size. Testes may shrink or atrophy during hormone replacement therapy or through chemical castration.

In all cases, the loss in testes volume corresponds with a loss of spermatogenesis.

== Society and culture ==
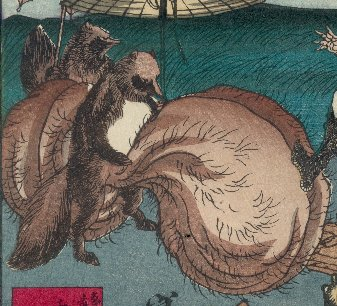
Depiction of bake-danuki with oversized testicles

The testicles of calves, lambs, roosters, turkeys, and other animals are eaten in many parts of the world, often under euphemistic culinary names. Testicles are a by-product of the castration of young animals raised for meat, so they might have been a late-spring seasonal specialty. In modern times, they are generally frozen and available year-round.

In the Middle Ages, men who wanted a boy sometimes had their left testicle removed. This was because people believed that the right testicle made "boy" sperm and the left made "girl" sperm. As early as 330 BC, Aristotle prescribed the ligation (tying off) of the left testicle in men wishing to have boys.

=== Etymology and slang ===
One theory about the etymology of the word testis is based on Roman law. The original Latin word testis 'witness', was used in the firmly established legal principle "Testis unus, testis nullus" (one witness [equals] no witness), meaning that testimony by any one person in court was to be disregarded unless corroborated by the testimony of at least another. This led to the common practice of producing two witnesses, bribed to testify the same way in cases of lawsuits with ulterior motives. Since such witnesses always came in pairs, the meaning was accordingly extended, often in the diminutive (testiculus, testiculi).

Another theory says that testis is influenced by a loan translation, from Greek parastatēs 'defender (in law), supporter' that is "two glands side by side".

There are multiple slang terms for the testes. They may be referred to as "balls". Frequently, "nuts" (sometimes intentionally misspelled as "nutz") are also a slang term for the testes due to the geometric resemblance. One variant of the term includes "Deez Nuts", which was used for a satirical political candidate in 2016. British slang terms include goolies.

In Spanish, the slang term huevos is used, which is Spanish for eggs which typically refers to unfertilized chicken eggs. Note that this is a non-sequitur or false analogy. The male gonad in mammals produces sperm (which transport male gametes to an egg). The male gonad does not produce the female gametes found in eggs. Perhaps the word huevos is used as slang for male testes because the body of each epididymus within the scrotum has an overall shape similar to that of a common bird egg.

== Other animals ==
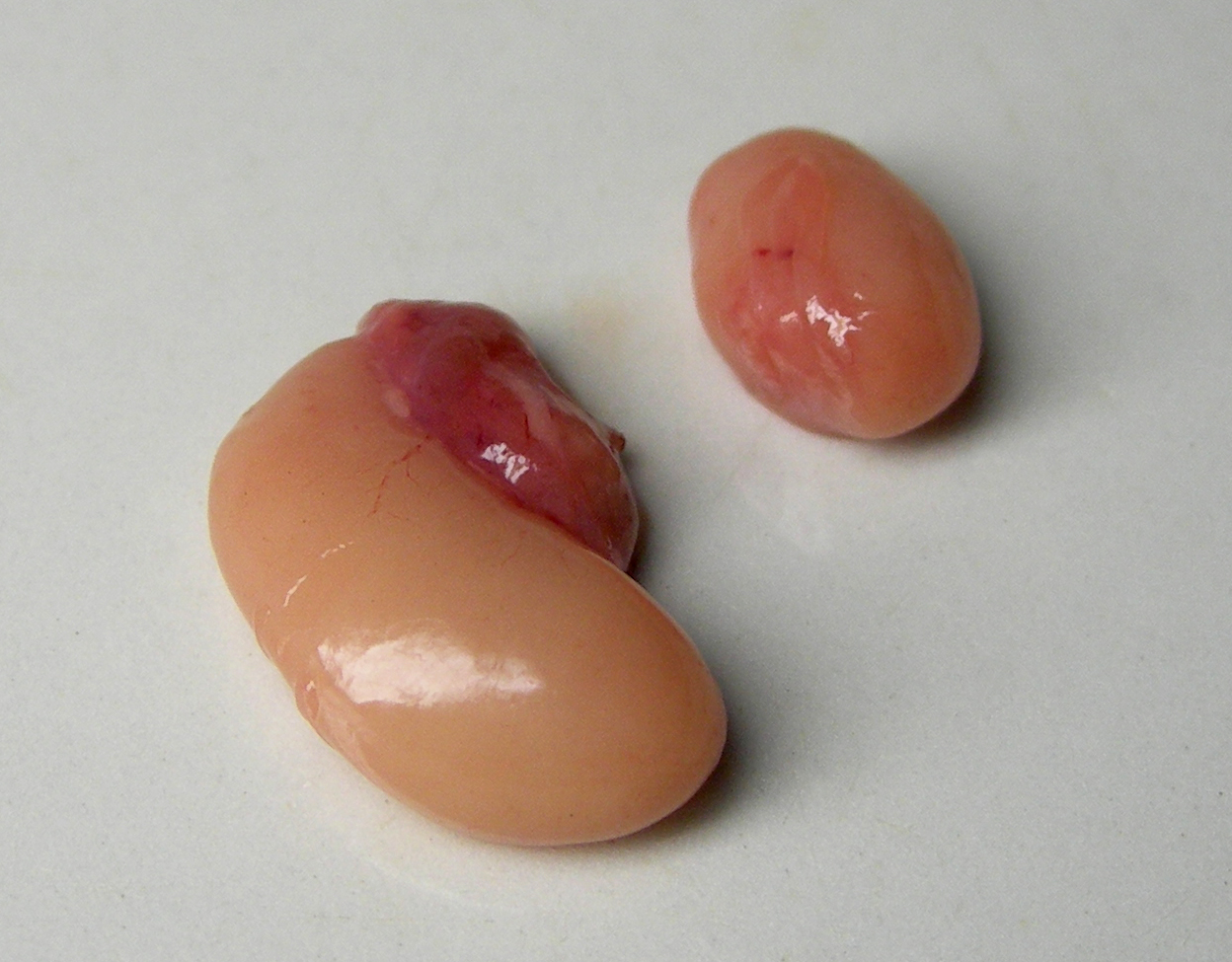
Testicles of a rooster

=== External appearance ===
In seasonal breeders, the weight of the testes often increases during the breeding season. The testicles of a dromedary camel are 7–10 cm (2.8–3.9 in) long, 4.5 cm (1.8 in) deep and 5 cm (2.0 in) in width. The right testicle is often smaller than the left.

In sharks, the testicle on the right side is usually larger. In many bird and mammal species, the left may be larger. Fish usually have two testes of a similar size. The primitive jawless fish have only a single testis, located in the midline of the body, although this forms from the fusion of paired structures in the embryo.

=== Location ===
==== Internal ====
The basal condition for mammals is to have internal testes. The testes of monotremes, xenarthrans, and afrotherians remain within the abdomen (testicondy). There are also some marsupials with external testes and boreoeutherian mammals with internal testes, such as the rhinoceros. Cetaceans such as whales and dolphins also have internal testes, as external testes would increase drag in the water. They are kept cool by special circulatory systems that cool the arterial blood going to the testes by placing the arteries near veins bringing cooled venous blood from the skin. In odobenids and phocids, the location of the testes is para-abdominal, though otariids have scrotal testes.

==== External ====
Boreoeutherian land mammals, the large group of mammals that includes humans, have externalized testes. Their testes function best at temperatures lower than their core body temperature. Their testes are located outside of the body and are suspended by the spermatic cord within the scrotum.

There are several hypotheses as to why most boreoeutherian mammals have external testes that operate best at a temperature that is slightly less than the core body temperature. One view is that it is stuck with enzymes evolved in a colder temperature due to external testes evolving for different reasons. Another view is that the lower temperature of the testes simply is more efficient for sperm production.

The classic hypothesis is that cooler temperature of the testes allows for more efficient fertile spermatogenesis. There are no possible enzymes operating at normal core body temperature that are as efficient as the ones evolved.

Early mammals had lower body temperatures and thus their testes worked efficiently within their body. However, boreotherian mammals may have higher body temperatures than the other mammals and had to develop external testes to keep them cool. One argument is that mammals with internal testes, such as the monotremes, armadillos, sloths, elephants, and rhinoceroses, have a lower core body temperatures than those mammals with external testes.

Researchers have wondered why birds, despite having very high core body temperatures, have internal testes and did not evolve external testes. It was once theorized that birds used their air sacs to cool the testes internally, but later studies revealed that birds' testes are able to function at core body temperature.

Some mammals with seasonal breeding cycles keep their testes internal until the breeding season. After that, their testes descend and increase in size and become external.

The ancestor of the boreoeutherian mammals may have been a small mammal that required very large testes for sperm competition and thus had to place its testes outside the body. This might have led to enzymes involved in spermatogenesis, spermatogenic DNA polymerase beta and recombinase activities evolving a unique temperature optimum that is slightly less than core body temperature. When the boreoeutherian mammals diversified into forms that were larger or did not require intense sperm competition, they still produced enzymes that operated best at cooler temperatures and had to keep their testes outside the body. This position is made less parsimonious because the kangaroo, a non-boreoeutherian mammal, has external testicles. Separately from boreotherian mammals, the ancestors of kangaroos might have also been subject to heavy sperm competition and thus developed external testes; however, kangaroo external testes are suggestive of a possible adaptive function for external testes in large animals.

One argument for the evolution of external testes is that it protects the testes from abdominal cavity pressure changes caused by jumping and galloping.

Mild, transient scrotal heat stress causes DNA damage, reduced fertility and abnormal embryonic development in mice. DNA strand breaks were found in spermatocytes recovered from testicles subjected to 40 °C or 42 °C for 30 minutes. These findings suggest that the external location of the testicles provides the adaptive benefit of protecting spermatogenic cells from heat-induced DNA damage that could otherwise lead to infertility and germline mutation.

=== Size ===
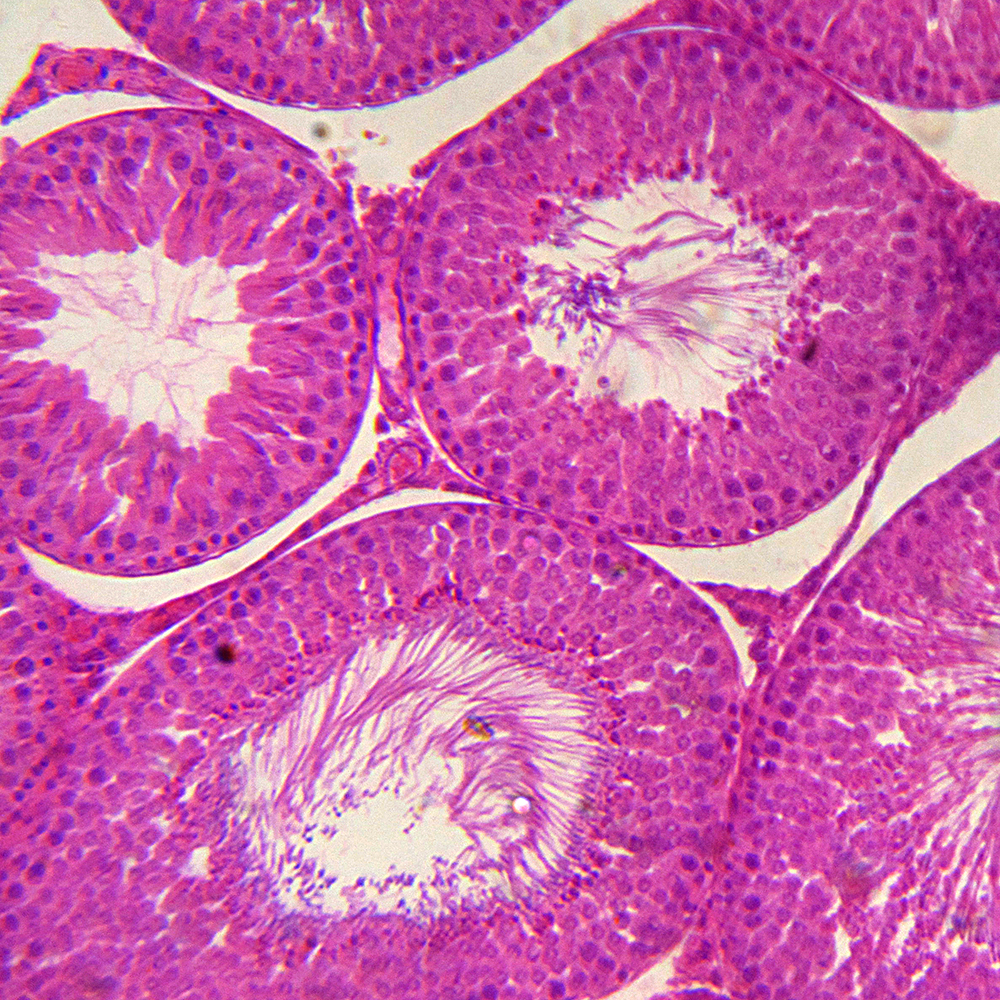
Cross section of rabbit testis, photographed in bright-field microscopy at 40× magnification

The relative size of the testes is often influenced by mating systems. Testicular size as a proportion of body weight varies widely. In the mammalian kingdom, there is a tendency for testicular size to correspond with multiple mates (e.g., harems, polygamy). Production of testicular output sperm and spermatic fluid is also larger in polygamous animals, possibly a spermatogenic competition for survival. The testes of the right whale are likely to be the largest of any animal, each weighing around 500 kg (1,100 lb).

Among the Hominidae, gorillas have little female promiscuity and sperm competition and the testes are small compared to body weight (0.03%). Chimpanzees have high promiscuity and large testes compared to body weight (0.3%). Human testicular size falls between these extremes (0.08%).

Testis weight also varies in seasonal breeders like red foxes, golden jackals, and coyotes.

=== Internal structure ===
Amphibians and most fish do not possess seminiferous tubules. Instead, the sperm are produced in spherical structures called sperm ampullae. These are seasonal structures, releasing their contents during the breeding season, and then being reabsorbed by the body. Before the next breeding season, new sperm ampullae begin to form and ripen. The ampullae are otherwise essentially identical to the seminiferous tubules in higher vertebrates, including the same range of cell types.

== Gallery ==
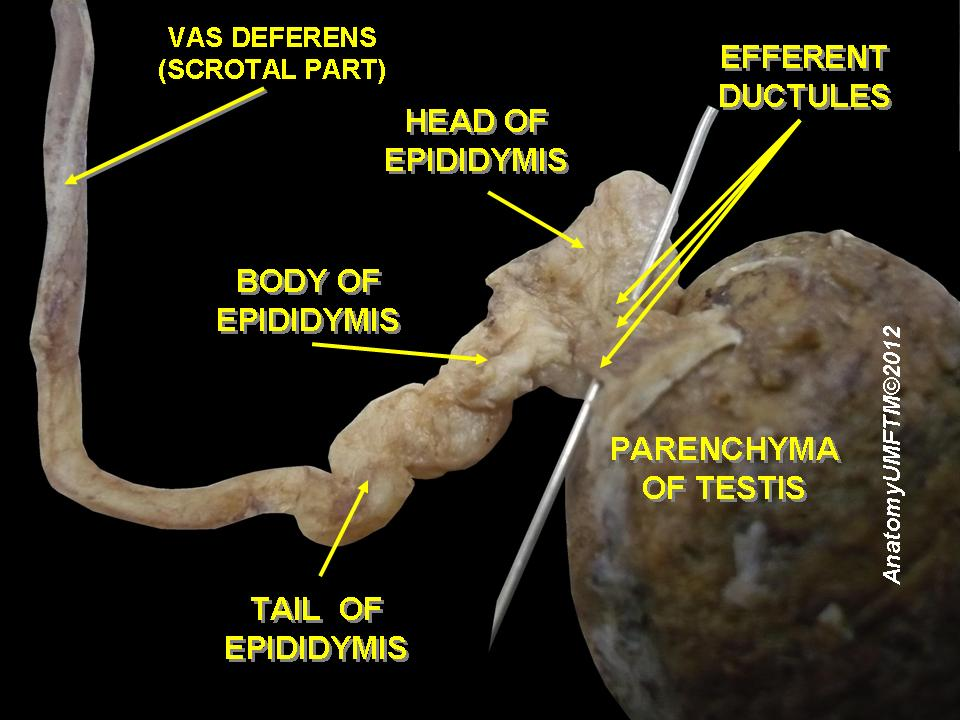
Testicle

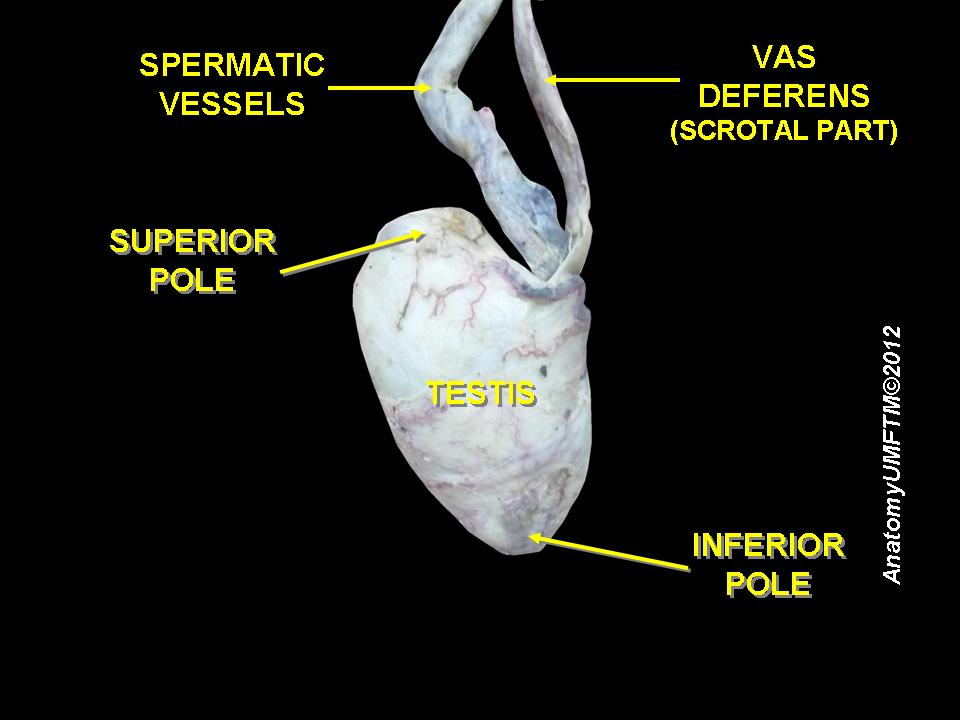
Testicle

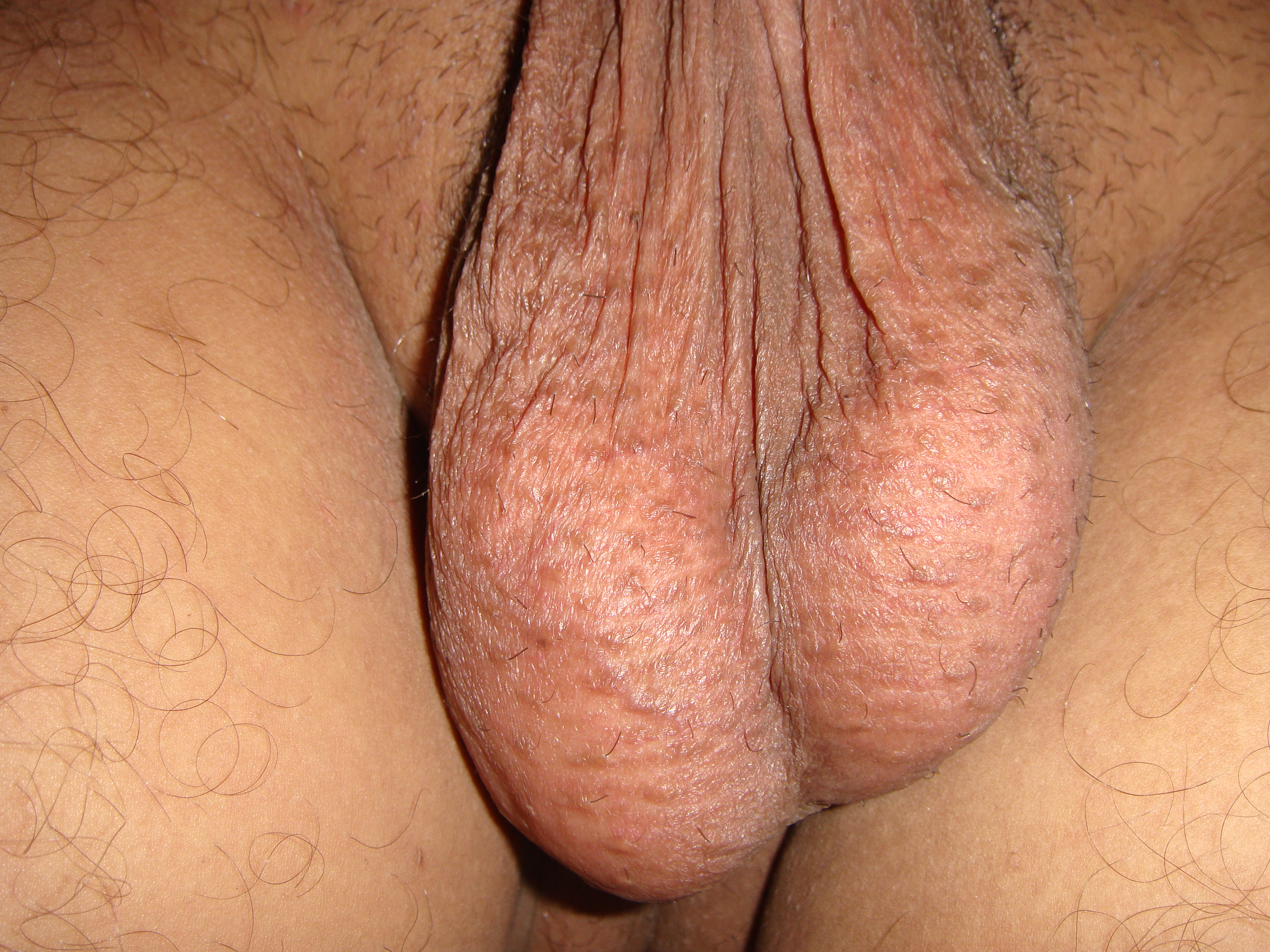
Testicle hanging on cremaster muscle. These are two healthy testicles. Heat causes them to descend, allowing cooling.

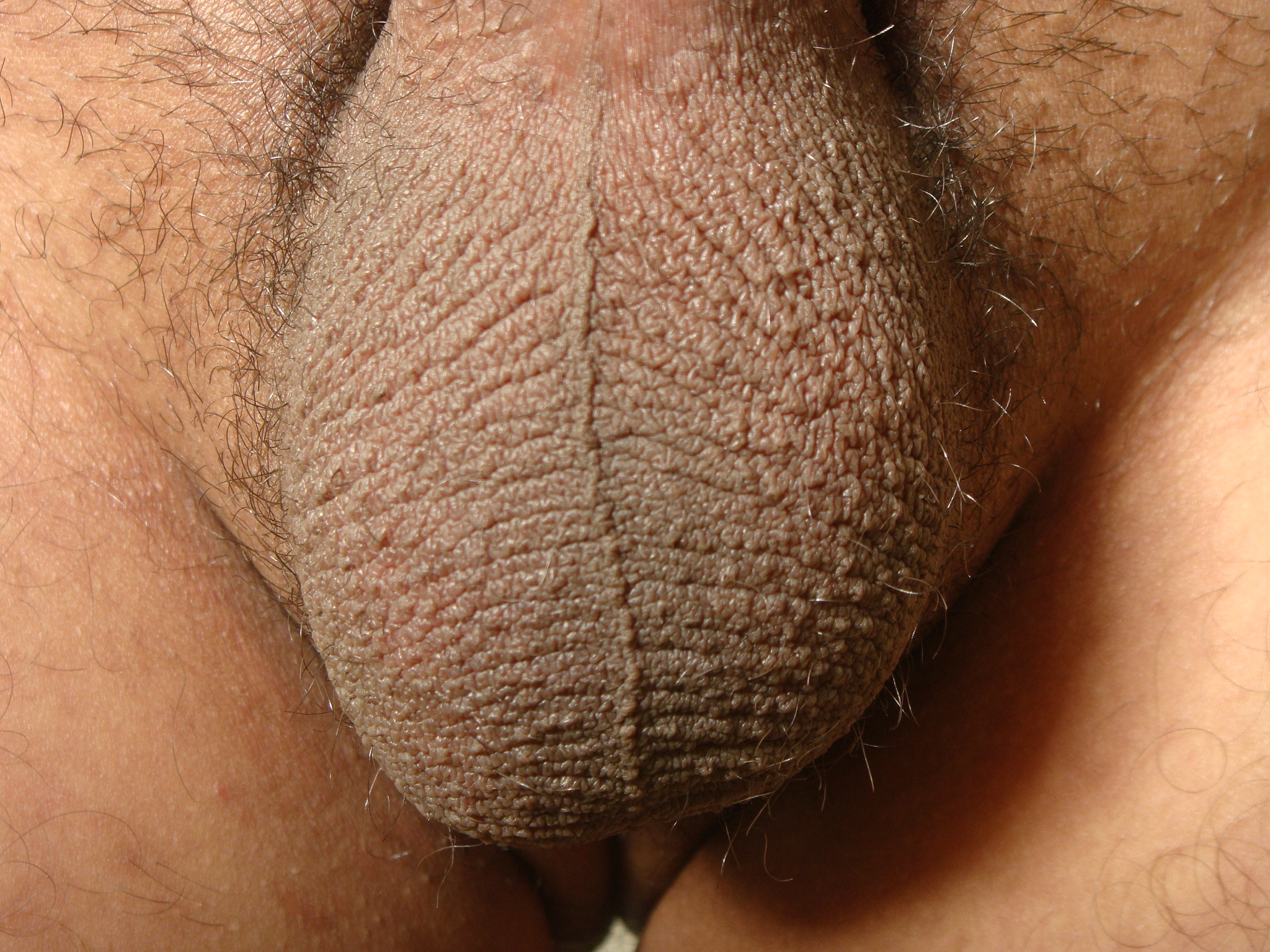
A healthy scrotum containing normal size testes. The scrotum is in tight condition. The image also shows the texture.

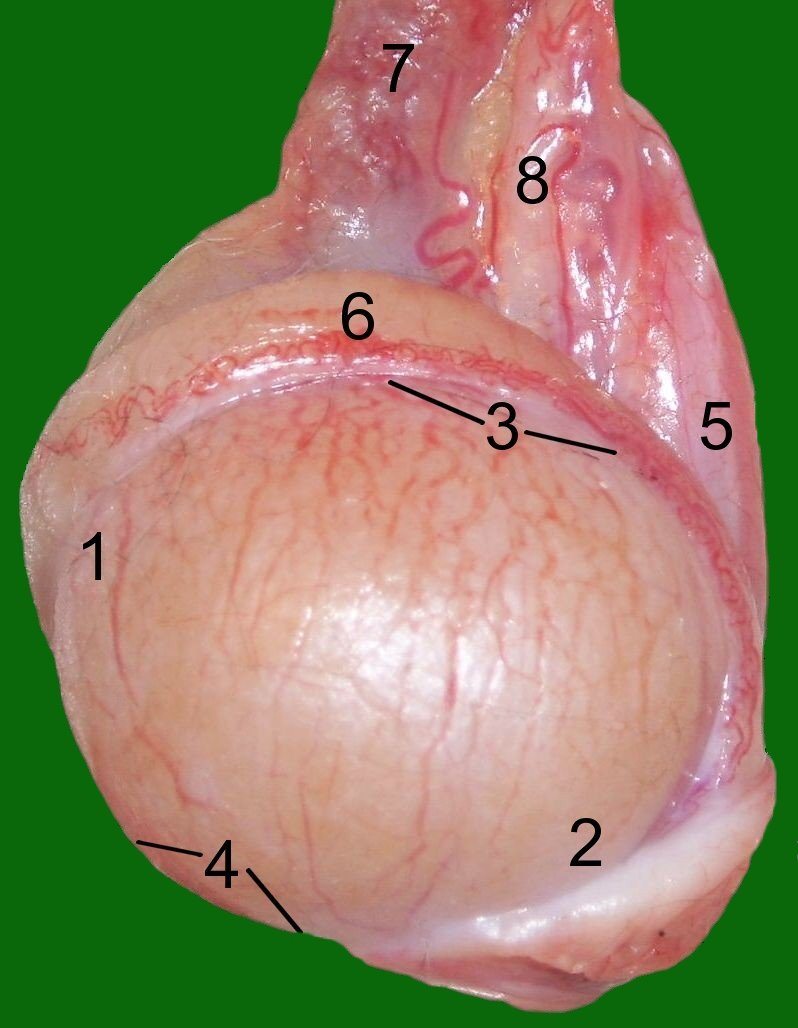
Testicle of a cat: 1: Extremitas capitata, 2: Extremitas caudata, 3: Margo epididymalis, 4: Margo liber, 5: Mesorchium, 6: Epididymis, 7: testicular artery and vene, 8: Ductus deferens

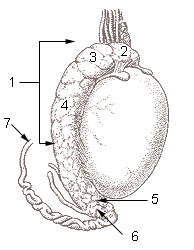
Testis surface

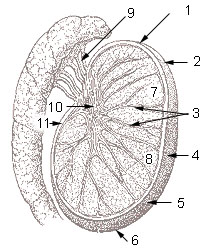
Testis cross section

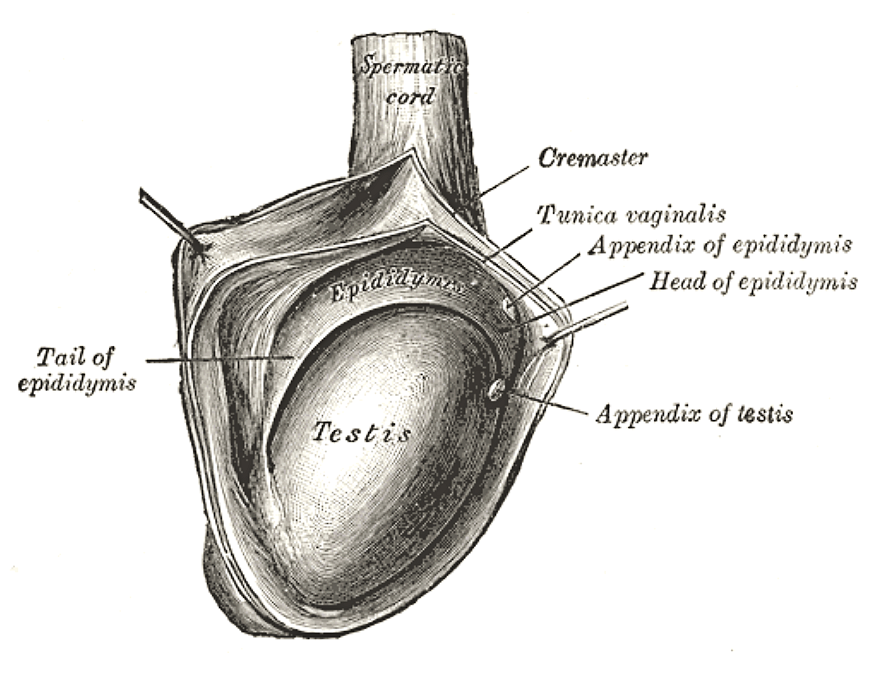
The right testis, exposed by laying open the tunica vaginalis.

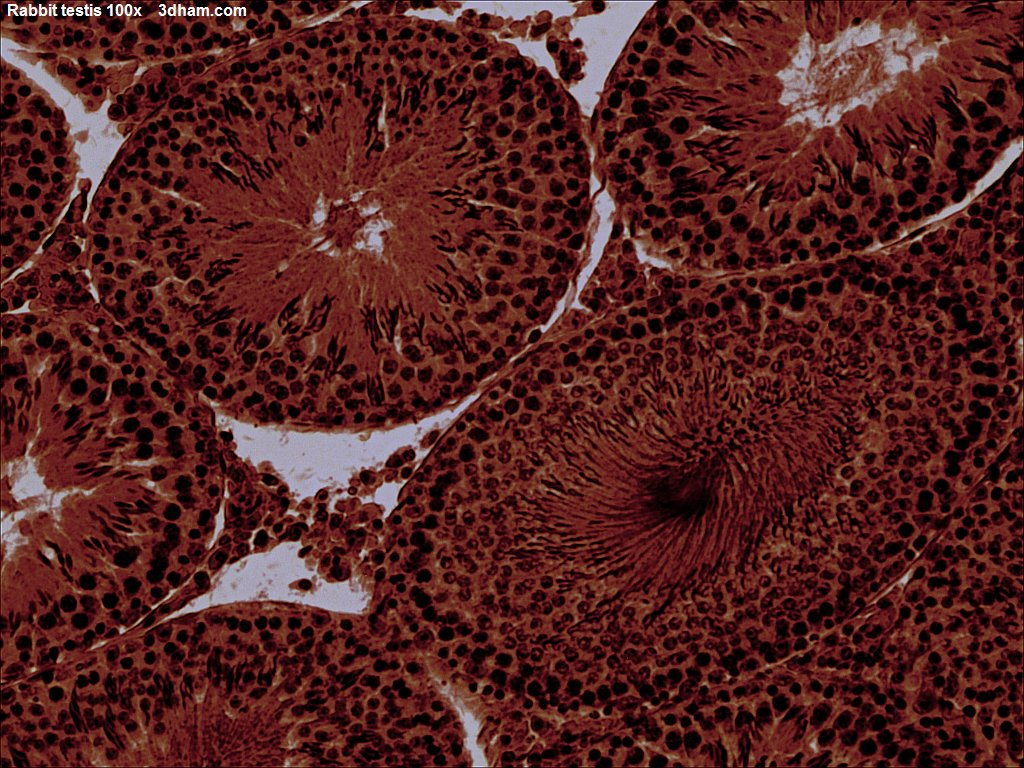
Microscopic view of rabbit testis 100×

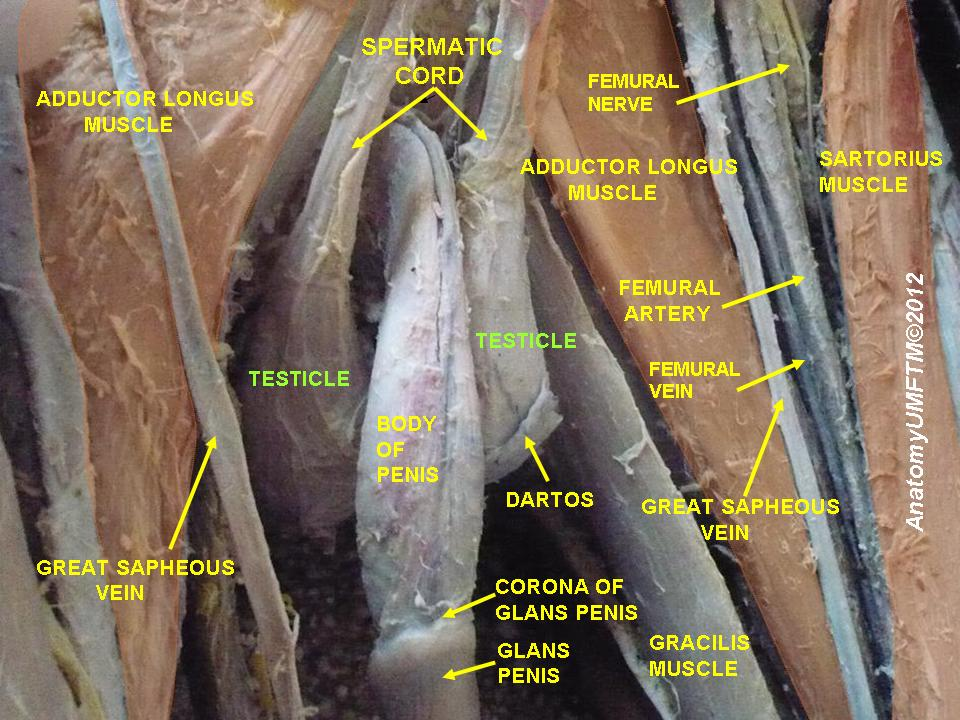
Testicle

== See also ==
- Anorchia
- Anther
- Antheridium
- Bollocks
- Cryptorchidism (cryptorchismus)
- Ejaculation
- Eunuchs
- Gelding
- List of homologues of the human reproductive system
- Neutering
- Perineum
- Polyorchidism
- Sterilization (surgical procedure), vasectomy
- Testicular nubbin

== General and cited references ==
- Heptner, V. G.; Naumov, N. P. (1998). Mammals of the Soviet Union Vol. II Part 1a, SIRENIA AND CARNIVORA (Sea cows; Wolves and Bears). Enfield, NH: Science Publishers. ISBN 978-1-886106-81-9. OCLC 490089621.
