= Tunica albuginea (ovaries) =

Details

Identifiers
- Latin: tunica albuginea ovarii
- TA98: A09.1.01.009; A09.3.01.016
- TA2: 3478
- FMA: 18630

The tunica albuginea is a layer of condensed fibrous tissue that makes up the ovarian capsule that surrounds the ovary.

== Structure ==
The tunica albuginea is composed of short connective tissue fibers. It is located immediately inside the ovarian surface epithelium (previously known as germinal epithelium which is continuous with the peritoneum. It is non-vascularised. It is thinner than the tunica albuginea of the testis, and its thickness varies across the ovary.

=== Development ===
The tunica albuginea is formed late in prenatal development when it buds off from mesonephric stroma.
