= Lateral surface =

Area of all the sides of the object, excluding the area of its base and top

Straight circular cylinder with unrolled lateral surface

The lateral surface of a three-dimensional object is the surface of all its sides, excluding its base and top (when they exist). The distinction between lateral and non-lateral surfaces is most commonly applied to prisms, cylinders, pyramids, and cones, where there is a natural separation between the base face(s) and the remaining faces or curved surface.

== Definition ==
The lateral surface area (LSA) is the area of the lateral surface. This is distinguished from the total surface area (TSA), which is the lateral surface area together with the areas of the base and top. In practical applications, the lateral surface area is relevant when calculating quantities such as the amount of material needed to wrap the sides of a container, the area of a wall to be painted, or the label for a cylindrical can.

== Formulas ==
=== Prism ===
The lateral surface area of a prism is the sum of the areas of its lateral faces (the faces that are not bases). For a right prism — one whose lateral edges are perpendicular to the bases — the lateral surface area equals the perimeter of the base multiplied by the height of the prism:

A_{lateral} = P ⋅ h

where P is the perimeter of the base and h is the height (the perpendicular distance between the two bases).

As a special case, for a cube with edge length a, the lateral surface area consists of four square faces: A_{lateral} = 4a^{2}.

For a rectangular prism (cuboid) with base dimensions l and w and height h, the lateral surface area is:

A_{lateral} = 2(l + w) ⋅ h

=== Cylinder ===
A cylinder's lateral surface unrolls into a rectangle

For a right circular cylinder with radius r and height h, the lateral surface is the curved surface connecting the two circular bases. When this surface is "unrolled" (i.e. developed into a plane), it forms a rectangle with width equal to the circumference of the base (2πr) and height h. Thus:

A_{lateral} = 2πrh

The total surface area of the cylinder is obtained by adding the areas of the two circular bases:

A_{total} = 2πrh + 2πr^{2} = 2πr(h + r)

=== Pyramid ===
For a pyramid, the lateral surface area is the sum of the areas of all the triangular lateral faces, excluding the base.

For a regular pyramid — one whose base is a regular polygon and whose apex lies directly above the centre of the base — the lateral faces are congruent isosceles triangles. In this case, the lateral surface area is:

A_{lateral} = 1/2 P ⋅ l

where P is the perimeter of the base and l is the slant height (the distance from the apex to the midpoint of a base edge, measured along a lateral face).

=== Cone ===
For a right circular cone with base radius r and slant height l, the lateral surface area is:

A_{lateral} = πrl

The slant height can be found from the radius and the (vertical) height h of the cone using the Pythagorean theorem:

l = √r^{2} + h^{2}

This formula can be understood by cutting the lateral surface of the cone along a slant line from the apex to the base and unrolling it into a flat sector of a circle with radius l and arc length 2πr.

=== Frustum ===
A frustum is the portion of a cone or pyramid that lies between two parallel planes cutting through it. For a right circular conical frustum with top radius r_{1}, bottom radius r_{2}, and slant height l, the lateral surface area is:

A_{lateral} = π(r_{1} + r_{2}) ⋅ l

where the slant height is given by:

l = √(r_{2} − r_{1})^{2} + h^{2}

This generalises the cone formula (setting r_{1} = 0) and can also be seen as the difference between the lateral areas of two nested cones.

== Summary of formulas ==
Solid	Lateral surface area	Variables
Cube	4a^{2}	a = edge length
Right prism	P ⋅ h	P = base perimeter, h = height
Right circular cylinder	2πrh	r = radius, h = height
Regular pyramid	1/2 P ⋅ l	P = base perimeter, l = slant height
Right circular cone	πrl	r = radius, l = slant height
Right circular frustum	π(r_{1} + r_{2}) ⋅ l	r_{1}, r_{2} = radii, l = slant height

== See also ==
- Surface area
- Prism (geometry)
- Cylinder (geometry)
- Cone
- Pyramid (geometry)
- Frustum
- Net (polyhedron)
