= Efferent ducts =

Testicular anatomical structure

- The location of the efferent ducts within an adult human testicle

Details
- Precursor: Excretory mesonephric tubules

Identifiers
- Latin: ductus efferentes testis
- FMA: 19081

The efferent ducts (also efferent ductules, ductuli efferentes, ductus efferentes, or vasa efferentia) connect the rete testis with the initial section of the epididymis.

There are two basic designs for efferent ductule structure:

- a) multiple entries into the epididymis, as seen in most large mammals. In humans and other large mammals, there are approximately 15 to 20 efferent ducts, which also occupy nearly one-third of the head of the epididymis.
- b) single entry, as seen in most small animals such as rodents, whereby the 3–6 ductules merge into a single small ductule before entering the epididymis.

The ductuli are unilaminar and composed of columnar ciliated and non-ciliated (absorptive) cells. The ciliated cells serve to stir the luminal fluids, possibly to help ensure homogeneous absorption of water from the fluid produced by the testis, which increases the concentration of luminal sperm. The epithelium is surrounded by a band of smooth muscle that helps to propel the sperm toward the epididymis.

== Additional images ==
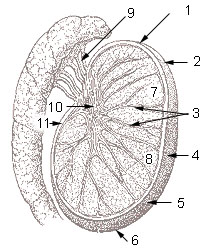

== See also ==
- List of distinct cell types in the adult human body
