= Chronic testicular pain =

- Other names: Chronic orchialgia
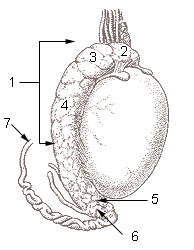
- 1 - 6: Epididymis 7: Vas deferens
- Differential diagnosis: Varicocele, spermatocele, Henoch–Schönlein purpura, post-vasectomy pain syndrome, chronic pelvic pain syndrome

Chronic testicular pain is long-term pain of the testes. It is considered chronic if it has persisted for more than three months. Chronic testicular pain may be caused by injury, infection, surgery, cancer, varicocele, or testicular torsion, and is a possible complication after vasectomy. IgG4-related disease is a more recently identified cause of chronic orchialgia.

One author describes the syndromes of chronic testicular pain thus:

The complaint is of a squeezing deep ache in the testis like the day after you got kicked there, often bilateral or alternating from one side to the other, intermittent, and, most commonly, associated with lower back pain. Sometimes it feels like the testicle is pinched in the crotch of the underwear but trouser readjustment does not help. There may also be pain in the inguinal area but no nausea or other symptoms. Back pain may be concurrent or absent and some patients have a long history of low back pain. Onset of pain is commonly related to activity that would stress the low back such as lifting heavy objects. Other stresses that might cause low back pain are imaginative coital positions, jogging, sitting hunched over a computer, long car driving, or other such positions of unsupported seating posture that flattens the normal lumbar lordosis curve.

== Diagnosis ==
Testing for gonorrhea and chlamydia should be routinely performed.

=== Differential diagnosis ===
- Post-vasectomy pain syndrome

== Treatment ==
Treatment is often with NSAIDs and antibiotics however, this is not always effective.
