= Testicular pain =

- Other names: Scrotal pain, orchialgia
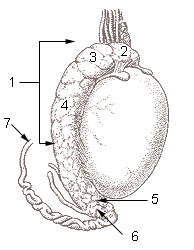
- 1 - 6: Epididymis 7: Vas deferens
- Specialty: Urology
- Diagnostic method: Ultrasound, urine tests, blood tests
- Differential diagnosis: Acute: Epididymitis, testicular torsion, testicular cancer, varicocele, Fournier gangrene Chronic: Varicocele, spermatocele, Henoch–Schönlein purpura, post-vasectomy pain syndrome, chronic pelvic pain syndrome

Testicular pain, also known as scrotal pain, occurs when part or all of either one or both testicles hurts. Pain in the scrotum is also often included. Testicular pain may be of sudden onset or of long duration.

Causes range from non-serious muscular skeletal problems to emergency conditions such as Fournier gangrene and testicular torsion. The diagnostic approach involves making sure no serious conditions are present. Diagnosis may be supported by ultrasound, urine tests, and blood tests.

Pain management is typically given with definitive management depending on the underlying cause.

== Definition ==
Testicular pain is when part or all of either one or both testicles hurts. Pain of the scrotum is often included. It may be either acute, subacute, or chronic depending on its duration.

=== Chronic scrotal pain ===
Chronic scrotal pain (pain for greater than 3 months) may occur due to several underlying conditions. It occurs in 15-19% of men post vasectomy, due to infections such as epididymitis, prostatitis, and orchitis, as well as varicocele, hydrocele, spermatocele, polyarteritis nodosa, testicular torsion, previous surgery and trauma. In 25% of cases the cause is never determined. The pain can persist for a long and indefinite period following the vasectomy, in which case it is termed post-vasectomy pain syndrome (PVPS).

== Differential diagnosis ==
The differential diagnosis of testicular pain is broad and involves conditions from benign to life-threatening. The most common causes of pain in children presenting to the emergency room are testicular torsion (16%), torsion of a testicular appendage (46%), and epididymitis (35%). In adults, the most common cause is epididymitis.

=== Testicular torsion ===
Testicular torsion usually presents with an acute onset of diffuse testicular pain and tenderness of fewer than six hours. There is often an absent or decreased cremasteric reflex, the testicle is elevated, and often is horizontal. It occurs annually in about 1 in 4,000 males before 25 years of age, is most frequent among adolescents (65% of cases presenting between 12 and 18 years of age), and is rare after 35 years of age. Because it can lead to necrosis within a few hours, it is considered a surgical emergency. Another version of this condition is a chronic illness called intermittent testicular torsion (ITT) which is characterized by recurrent rapid acute onset of pain in one testis which will temporarily assume a horizontal or elevated position in the scrotum similar to that of a full torsion followed by eventual spontaneous detortion and rapid solution of pain. Nausea or vomiting may also occur.

=== Epididymitis and orchitis ===
Epididymitis occurs when there is inflammation of the epididymis (a curved structure at the back of the testicle). This condition usually presents with gradual onset of varying degrees of pain, and the scrotum may be red, warm and swollen. It is often accompanied by symptoms of a urinary tract infection, and fever, and in over half of cases it presents in combination with orchitis. In those between the ages of 14 and 35 it is usually caused by either gonorrhea or chlamydia. In people either older or younger E. coli is the most common bacterial infection. Treatment involves the use of antibiotics.

=== Fournier's gangrene ===
Fournier's gangrene (an aggressive and rapidly spreading infection of the perineum) usually presents with fever and intense pain. It is a rare condition but fatal if not identified and aggressively treated with a combination of surgical debridement and broad-spectrum antibiotics.

=== Others ===
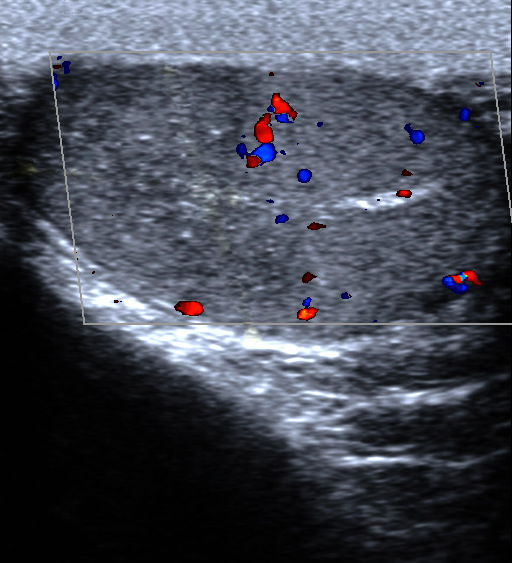
Segmental testis infarction in a patient presenting with right testis pain.

Many other less common conditions can lead to testicular pain. These include inguinal hernias, injury, hydroceles, degenerative disease of lumbar spine, disc herniations, and varicoceles among others. Testicular cancer is usually painless. Another potential cause is epididymal hypertension (also known as "blue balls").

== Diagnostic approach ==
=== Physical findings ===
The cremaster reflex (elevation of the testicle in response to stroking the upper inner thigh) is typically present in epididymitis but absent in testicular torsion as the testis is already elevated. Prehn's sign (the relief of pain with elevation) though a classic physical exam finding is not reliable in distinguishing torsion from other causes of testicular pain such as epididymitis.

=== Laboratory tests ===
Useful tests that may help in the determination of the cause include a urinalysis (usually normal in testicular torsion). Pyuria and bacteriuria (white blood cells and bacteria in the urine) in patients with acute scrotum suggests an infectious cause such as epididymitis or orchitis and specific testing for gonorrhea and chlamydia should be done. All people with chronic pain should be tested for gonorrhea and chlamydia.

=== Imaging ===
Ultrasound is useful if the cause is uncertain based on the above measures. If the diagnosis of torsion is certain, imaging should not delay definitive management such as physical maneuvers and surgery.
