= Testicular atrophy =

Reduction in the size and function of the testicles

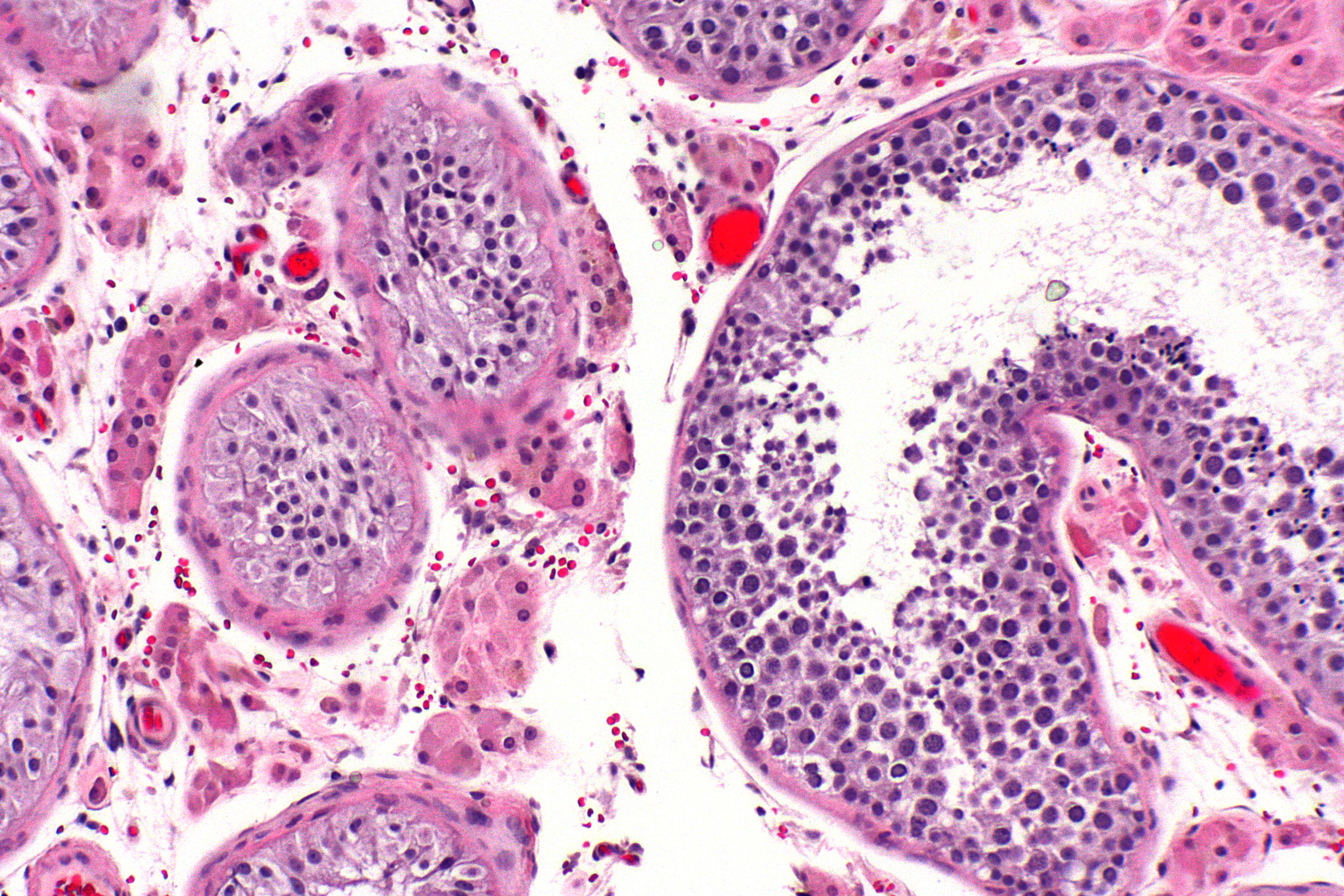
Microscopic view of testicular atrophy (intermediate magnification)

Testicular atrophy is a medical condition in which one or both testicles (or "testes") diminish in size and may be accompanied by reduced testicular function. Testicular atrophy is not related to the temporary shrinkage of the surrounding scrotum, which might occur in response to cold temperature.

As the testicles are involved in testosterone and sperm production, the signs and symptoms of testicular atrophy overlap with those related to infertility or low testosterone levels. In prepubescent testicular atrophy, there may be underdevelopment of secondary sex characteristics (e.g. lack of penis growth). In sexually developed individuals, testicular atrophy may be accompanied with lower sex drive and increased breast tissue. Additional signs and symptoms vary and can depend on the specific cause of the testicle shrinkage. Some causes include age, alcohol use, anabolic steroid use, testosterone replacement therapy, direct damage to the testicles, and infection.

Diagnosis of testicular atrophy includes physical examination of the testicles as well as imaging to measure testicular volume. A testosterone blood level is also taken to assess function of the testicles. Additional tests may be ordered depending on the suspected cause(s) of the shrinkage. Treatment and potential reversibility of testicular atrophy are also dependent on the cause.

== Signs and symptoms ==
There are different signs and symptoms associated with testicular atrophy depending on the person's age. Symptoms before puberty are centered more around the stunting of sexual characteristics associated with hormonal changes, while symptoms after puberty include a wider range of factors. Other signs and symptoms may stem from underlying conditions which cause testicular atrophy. The most perceptible sign of testicular atrophy is shrinkage of the testicle(s).

Signs and symptoms before puberty include:

- lack of development of pubic hair
- lack of development of facial hair
- lack of penis growth
- lower testosterone

Testosterone is a hormone that is found primarily in a portion of the male reproductive system called the testes and is normally measured in nanograms per deciliter. Testosterone is in charge of the growth and production of many sexual attributes in males, including facial hair, pubic hair, penis size, vocal and muscle mass changes, regulation of sex drive, and sperm production. Normal testosterone levels in males who have not yet hit puberty are less than 20 nanograms per deciliter. Low testosterone can be defined as hypogonadism in people with testes. Hypogonadism in people with testes is established as the hormonal inhibition of testosterone that can either be inherited or acquired at a later stage in life. Under the circumstances of pre-pubescent hypogonadism, many sexual developmental characteristics may be altered. Testosterone affects hair growth by regulating the follicle itself, which in turn affects the specific growth phases of the hair follicle. As a person with testes hits puberty, androgen, a steroid sex hormone, is produced at an increased rate, which creates terminal hair follicles. Terminal hair follicles create thicker and more pigmented hair which is also regulated by testosterone production. Testosterone also impacts pre-pubescent penis size by providing penile tissue with girth and density. The drop in testosterone values is mainly due to significant impairment of Leydig cells brought upon by hypogonadism. Leydig cells are located in the testes and serve to create testosterone and androgen. Once they are damaged, the production of testosterone is stunted.

Signs and symptoms after puberty include:

- reduced sex drive
- tender testicles
- trouble conceiving
- reduction of pubic or facial hair
- decreased muscle mass
- lower testosterone

Typical testosterone levels of people with testes after puberty range from 300 to 1,200 nanograms per deciliter. Low testosterone values in males post-puberty would be considered any value under 300 nanograms per deciliter. Decreased testosterone values caused by testicular atrophy can lead to and explain many of the signs and symptoms listed above, including a reduced sex drive, infertility, soft testicles, reduction of hair, and lower muscle mass throughout the body. Testosterone plays an important role in physiologically stimulating sex drive in people with testes. If testosterone levels drop below normal values, libido (sexual drive) is reduced, which can lead to the development of erectile dysfunction (a condition in which the penis is not able to get or stay erect). This can indirectly affect fertility as well. In addition, testosterone is important in muscle mass formation. It increases the amount of lean muscle mass in the body. Testosterone encourages metabolic activity in the body, which in turn stimulates protein synthesis. Protein synthesis is highly important for the development and enlargement of muscle. Therefore, a lack of testosterone would alter this metabolic process, leading to a decrease in muscle mass.

Signs and symptoms of testicular atrophy that are due to a secondary medical condition include:

- inflammation
- fever
- sensitivity or pain of the testicle(s)
- nausea

Secondary medical conditions that may cause the signs and symptoms listed above include testicular cancer, chronic alcohol use, sexually transmitted infections, COVID-19, orchitis, varicoceles, or torsion of the testes.

== Causes ==
=== Age ===
Shrinkage of the testicles is common with advanced age, as overall reproductive function declines.

=== Alcohol use ===
High alcohol usage lowers testosterone levels by direct damage to the Leydig cells (which produce testosterone) and by affecting hormones involved in signaling to the Leydig cells to produce testosterone. As a result, testicular atrophy is a common feature among individuals with high alcohol use. Testicular malformations and low testosterone levels is also commonly found in people with alcoholic cirrhosis as the negative effect of alcohol use is worsened by the liver damage itself. Excessive alcohol intake can cause inflammation and the degradation of cells in the liver, which can then cause testicular abnormalities (including testicular atrophy).

=== Anabolic steroid use and hormone therapy ===
Anabolic steroid use and testosterone replacement therapy (TRT) have been found to cause testicular atrophy through similar mechanisms. Anabolic steroids and TRT are both used (either by prescription or illicitly) to mimic the effects of testosterone produced by the body, such as building muscle and maintaining sex drive. However, they also inhibit the body's own production of sperm and testosterone, which can lead to shrinkage of the testicles.

Testicular atrophy is also a side effect of estrogen therapy.

=== COVID-19 ===
COVID-19 can lead to reduced testosterone production and testicular abnormalities due to changes in the secretion of gonadotropins, which are hormones involved in regulating testosterone production. These hormonal effects may be due to inflammation and oxidative stress caused by COVID-19. This might inform whether healthcare providers decide to monitor those who have survived COVID-19 for hormonal changes and potential fertility issues.

=== Orchitis ===
Orchitis, or inflammation of the testicles due to a bacterial or viral infection, can lead to testicular atrophy. Mumps has historically been significantly associated with orchitis and testicular atrophy, but has become rare in countries that have high mumps vaccination rates.

=== Varicoceles and testicular torsion ===
Varicoceles and testicular torsion are conditions in which direct damage to the testicles can potentially lead to testicular atrophy. Varicoceles are pooling of blood in the veins that deliver blood away from the testicles and are relatively common, occurring in approximately 15% of adolescent and adults with testicles. Currently, it is not clearly established how often varicoceles actually become a direct cause of issues related to fertility. Testicular torsion is the twisting of the testicle within the scrotum and can rapidly result in damage due to interruption in blood flow to the affected testicle. Unlike varicoceles, testicular torsion is considered a medical emergency.

=== Other health conditions ===
There is a possible correlation of cystic fibrosis and its impact to bilateral testicular atrophy. Cystic fibrosis is a disease which causes mucus buildup in various organs. Evidence has shown that cystic fibrosis affects multiple systems in the human body, including the reproductive system. Around 97-98% of people with cystic fibrosis who have testicles are infertile due to a missing vas deferens, the tube in the male reproductive system that carries sperm out of the testes. Additionally, cystic fibrosis can result in the atrophy of male reproductive organs by causing dehydrated secretions. In recent times a connection to H63D syndrome was found.

== Diagnosis ==
=== Physical examination ===
A healthcare provider may initially assess size and shape as well as firmness and texture of the testicles.

=== Ultrasonography ===
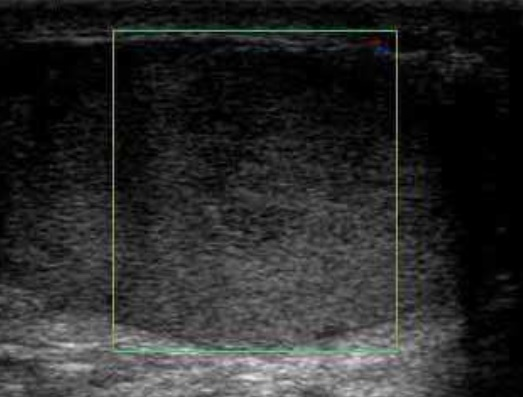
Ultrasonography of testicular torsion

Ultrasonography is used to detect testicular volume. Testicular volume measured to be less than 12 mL is a sign of testicular atrophy. In addition, testicular atrophy can be recognized as greater than 50% loss of testicular volume or a post-operative testicle with less than 25% of the volume of the opposite testicle. Online calculators have been developed to estimate testicular volume based on sonographic measurements.

=== Lab tests ===
Assessment of testicular function is also dependent on lab tests. Low testosterone is a potential cause of testicular atrophy, and laboratory values of blood samples can confirm low free or bioavailable testosterone.

Due to the high levels of oxidative stress in the semen, there may also be higher levels of sperm DNA fragmentation for people with varicoceles. In some cases, people with testicular damage who do not undergo repair of the varicoceles will have testicular atrophy.

== Treatment ==
=== Medication ===
Treatment with selective estrogen receptor modulators (SERMs) alone or in addition to self-administered injections of hCG aim to correct hormonal imbalances caused by anabolic steroid use and can help prevent or reverse testicular atrophy for some people.

=== Surgery ===
People who have testicular atrophy due to testicular torsion are immediately referred to surgery regardless of the ultrasound findings, since delays rapidly decrease the rate of recovery. The consequences of not treating will result in decreased fertility and may result in the need of an orchiectomy, a surgical procedure to remove one or both testicles. While immediate treatment can reduce the recovery time for the testes, there is still a chance of the testes to undergo atrophy a second time. Performance of an orchiectomy on individuals diagnosed with testicular atrophy has a possible negative impact on their testosterone levels in the long term. As a result, these individuals are typically monitored for the reoccurrence of testicular atrophy and low testosterone levels.

=== Lifestyle modifications ===
In addition to drug therapies and surgical interventions to treat testicular atrophy, lifestyle modifications might also be recommended by healthcare providers. Most lifestyle modifications target factors that contribute to infertility in men. Limiting or abstaining from alcohol intake, smoking, and drugs such as anabolic steroids, cannabis, or opioids can help with infertility. Additionally, diet modifications might be encouraged to reach a more balanced diet, such as a higher intake of fish, fruits, vegetables, nuts, seeds, whole grains, and healthier oils, such as olive oil and canola oil. Reducing intake of processed meats, and trans fats can also lead to improved fertility outcomes. Poor diet can otherwise lead to oxidative stress, which causes sperm damage, leading to lower testicular volume and lower sperm quality. Ensuring enough vitamin and mineral intake might also be recommended, since omega-3 fatty acids, antioxidant vitamins, zinc, and selenium might help reduce the damage by oxidative stress and reduce inflammation. Zinc intake can be boosted with meats and nuts, and selenium intake can be boosted with whole grains.

== See also ==
- Testicular nubbin
