= CPTP =

CPTP may refer to:

- Civilian Pilot Training Program
- Chronic Postvasectomy Testicular Pain
- Completely-positive trace preserving map in quantum physics
