= Prehn's sign =

Medical sign for testicular pain

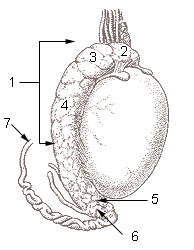
1: Epididymis 2: Head of epididymis 3: Lobules of epididymis 4: Body of epididymis 5: Tail of epididymis 6: Duct of epididymis 7: Deferent duct (ductus deferens or vas deferens)

Prehn's sign (named after urologist Douglas T. Prehn) is a medical diagnostic indicator that was once believed to help determine whether the presenting testicular pain is caused by acute epididymitis or from testicular torsion. Although elevation of the scrotum when differentiating epididymitis from testicular torsion is of clinical value, Prehn's sign has been shown to be inferior to Doppler ultrasound to rule out testicular torsion.

According to Prehn's sign, the physical lifting of the testicles relieves the pain of epididymitis but not pain caused by testicular torsion.

- Negative Prehn's sign indicates no pain relief with lifting the affected testicle, which points towards testicular torsion which is a surgical emergency and must be relieved within 6 hours.
- Positive Prehn's sign indicates there is pain relief with lifting the affected testicle, which points towards epididymitis.

Another way to differentiate between epididymitis and torsion on physical examination is checking for the cremaster reflex which is classically absent in the case of torsion.

== History ==
It was discovered in 1934, by Douglas T. Prehn (August 1, 1901 – June 30, 1974), a prominent American urologist in Wisconsin.
