= Pampiniform plexus =

Vein network in the human sex organs

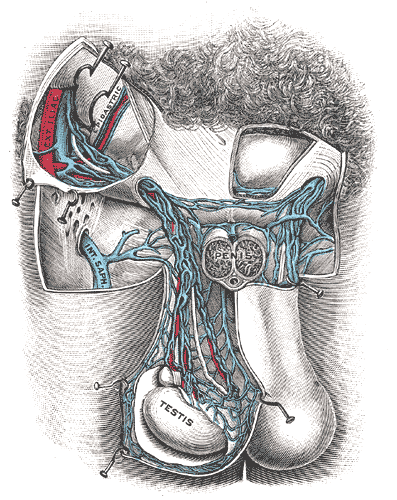
- Spermatic veins

Details
- Drains from: Testicle, epididymis
- Drains to: Testicular vein

Identifiers
- Latin: plexus venosus pampiniformis, plexus pampiniformis
- TA98: A12.3.09.015
- FMA: 19607

The pampiniform plexus (from Latin pampinus 'tendril' and forma 'form') is a venous plexus – a network of many small veins found in the human male spermatic cord, and in the suspensory ligament of the ovary in the female. In the male, it is formed by the union of multiple testicular veins from the back of the testis and tributaries from the epididymis.

== In the male ==
The veins of the plexus ascend along the spermatic cord in front of the vas deferens. Below the superficial inguinal ring they unite to form three or four veins, which pass along the inguinal canal, and, entering the abdomen through the deep inguinal ring, coalesce to form two veins. These again unite to form a single vein, the testicular vein, which opens on the right side into the inferior vena cava, at an acute angle, and on the left side into the left renal vein, at a right angle. The pampiniform plexus forms the chief mass of the cord.

In addition to its function in venous return from the testes, the pampiniform plexus also plays a role in the temperature regulation of the testes. It acts as a countercurrent heat exchanger, cooling blood in adjacent arteries. An abnormal enlargement of the pampiniform plexus is a medical condition called varicocele.

== In the female ==
In females, the pampiniform plexus drains the ovaries. The right ovary drains to the pampiniform plexus to the ovarian vein to the inferior vena cava. The left ovary drains to the pampiniform plexus, left ovarian vein, then the left renal vein, to the inferior vena cava.

While varicocele is the diagnostic term for swelling in the valveless venous distribution of the male pampiniform plexus, this embryological structure, common to males and females, is often incidentally noted to be swollen during laproscopic examinations in both symptomatic and asymptomatic females. Diagnosis of female varicocele, properly called pelvic compression syndrome, should be expected to be as frequent as male varicocele (15% of healthy asymptomatic men which are thought to develop primarily during puberty and prevalence increases approximately 10% per decade of life).

While one may expect that the female to have equal prevalence of pelvic compression syndrome due to the identical embryological origin of the valveless pampiniform plexus, this condition is thought to be underdiagnosed due to the broad differential of the pain pattern: unilateral or bilateral pain, dull to sharp, constant to intermittent pain worsening with any increase in abdominal pressure.

Physical exam has specificity of 77% and sensitivity of nearly 94% when the patient is noted to be tender over adnexa during physical examination with a history of postcoital pain for differentiating pelvic congestion syndrome from other pathologies of pelvic origin. Confirmatory imaging requires ultrasound while performing the Valsalva maneuver, while the gold standard remains ovarian and iliac catheter venography showing veins 5–10 mm in diameter during Valsalva.

== Clinical significance ==
Damage to the plexus during inguinal hernia repair is the chief cause of ischaemic orchitis following this surgery; such orchitis typically presents within a week post-surgery and is almost always self-limiting. Its incidence is <1% for primary hernia repair, but more for recurrent hernia repairs.

== See also ==
- Rete mirabile, vascular countercurrent heat- and mass-exchanging structures found in many vertebrate organs
