= Nubbin =

Nubbin may refer to:

- Nubbin (landform), small and gentle hill
- Supernumerary nipple
- Testicular nubbin, residual tissue of the human testis after a supposed perinatal vascular accident involving the testicular blood supply
- Nubbin, fictional shoeshine boy sidekick in John Law (comics)
- Nubbin, main character of the book, The Hound That Thought He Was a Raccoon
