= Pelvic compression syndrome =

Pelvic Compression Syndrome
- Specialty: Gynecology, Urology
- Symptoms: constant to intermittent, dull to sharp pain to the pelvis, especially with increased abdominal pressure and dyspareunia.
- Usual onset: puberty
- Duration: three months or longer
- Diagnostic method: Venography, physical exam
- Differential diagnosis: Painful bladder syndrome, pelvic inflammatory disease, interstitial cystitis, endometriosis, pelvic neuralgia, irritable bowel syndrome, myofascial pain, and pelvic floor myalgia
- Treatment: Ligation of incompetent veins
- Medication: Gonadotropin-releasing hormone agonists, danazol, combined oral contraceptives, progestins, phlebotonics, and non-steroidal anti-inflammatory drugs
- Frequency: unknown

Pelvic compression syndrome is characterized by intermittent or persisting pain in the abdomen, which is exacerbated by abdominal pressure. A swelling of the veins in the valveless pampiniform plexus causes it.

== Pathophysiology ==
While varicocele is the diagnostic term for swelling in the valveless venous distribution of the male pampiniform plexus, this embryological structure, common to males and females, is often incidentally noted to be swollen during laparoscopic examinations in both symptomatic and asymptomatic females. Diagnosis of female varicocele, properly called pelvic compression syndrome, should be expected to be as frequent as male varicocele (15% of healthy asymptomatic men, which are thought to develop primarily during puberty and prevalence increases approximately 10% per decade of life).

== Signs and symptoms ==
While one may expect the female to have an equal prevalence of pelvic compression syndrome due to the identical embryological origin of the valveless pampiniform plexus, this condition is thought to be underdiagnosed due to the broad differential of the pain pattern: unilateral or bilateral pain, dull to sharp, constant to intermittent pain worsening with any increase in abdominal pressure.

== Diagnosis ==
Physical exam has a specificity of 77% and sensitivity of nearly 94% when the patient is noted to be tender over adnexa during physical examination with a history of postcoital pain for differentiating pelvic congestion syndrome from other pathologies of pelvic origin.

== Imaging ==
Confirmatory imaging requires ultrasound while performing a Valsalva maneuver, while the gold standard remains ovarian and iliac catheter venography showing veins 5-10mm in diameter during the Valsalva maneuver.

== Prognosis ==
Complete resolution of symptoms after menopause indicates the influence of hormones on pelvic congestion syndrome. Estrogen is a venous dilator and can thus produce the venous dilation implicated in the pathophysiology of the PCS.
