= Epididymitis =

Inflammation of the epididymis, part of the testicle

- Other names: Inflammation of the epididymis
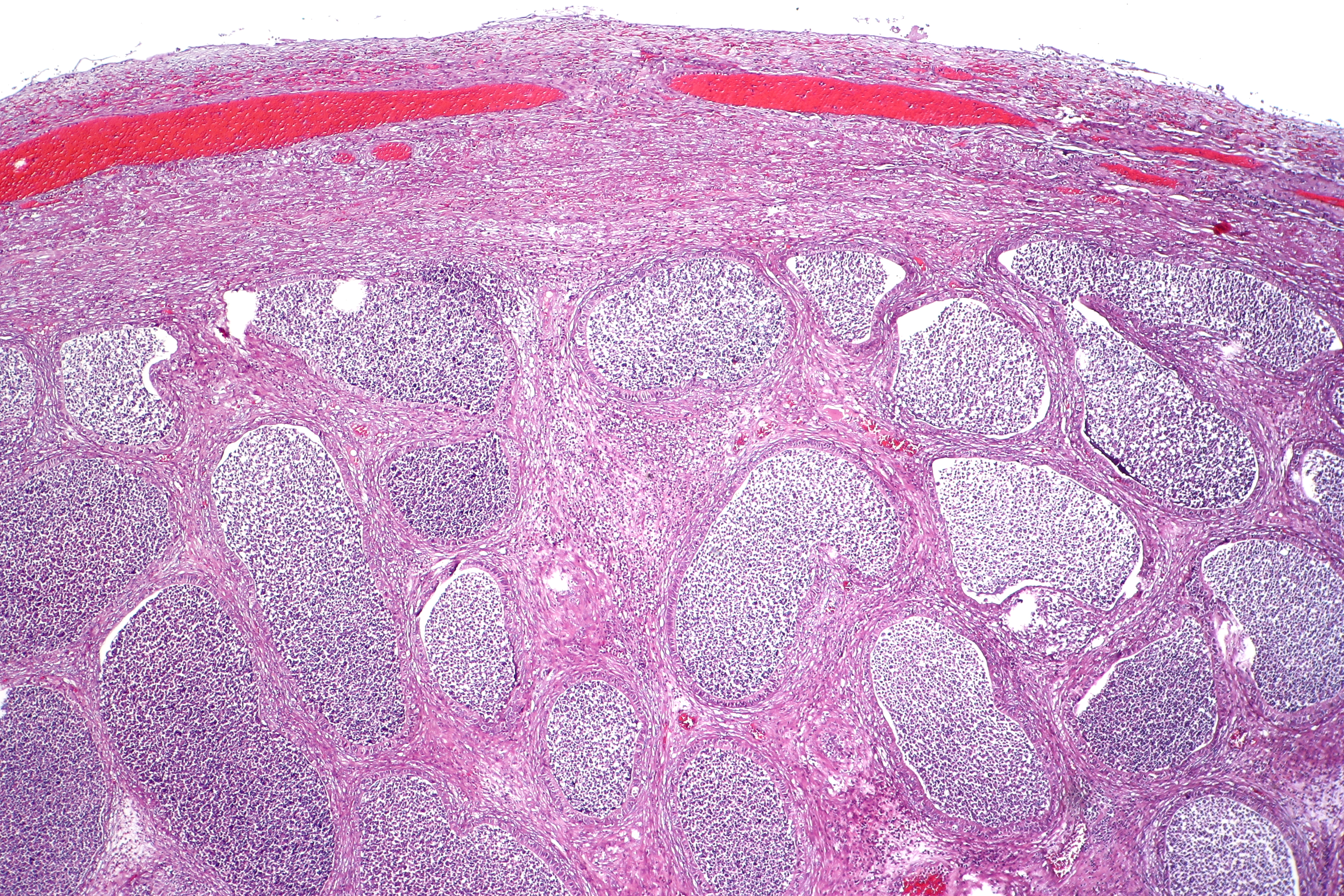
- Acute epididymitis with abundant fibrinopurulent exudate in the tubules.
- Pronunciation: /ˌɛpɪˌdɪdɪˈmaɪtɪs/ EP-ih-DID-im-EYE-tis
- Specialty: Urology, infectious disease
- Symptoms: Pain in the back of the testicle, swelling of the testicle, burning with urination, frequent urination
- Complications: Infertility, chronic pain
- Usual onset: Over a day or two
- Types: Acute (< 6 weeks), chronic (>12 weeks)
- Causes: Gonorrhea, chlamydia, enteric bacteria, reflux of urine
- Diagnostic method: Based on symptoms, ultrasound
- Differential diagnosis: Testicular torsion, inguinal hernia, testicular cancer, orchitis
- Treatment: Pain medications, antibiotics, elevation
- Medication: NSAIDs, ceftriaxone and doxycycline, ofloxacin
- Frequency: 600,000 per year (age 15-35, US)

Epididymitis is a medical condition characterized by inflammation of the epididymis, a curved structure at the back of the testicle. Onset of pain is typically over a day or two. The pain may improve with raising the testicle. Other symptoms may include swelling of the testicle, burning with urination, or frequent urination. Inflammation of the testicle is commonly also present.

In those who are young and sexually active, gonorrhea and chlamydia are frequently the underlying cause. In older males and men who practice insertive anal sex, enteric bacteria are a common cause. Diagnosis is typically based on symptoms. Conditions that may result in similar symptoms include testicular torsion, inguinal hernia, and testicular cancer. Ultrasound can be useful if the diagnosis is unclear.

Treatment may include pain medications, NSAIDs, and elevation. Recommended antibiotics in those who are young and sexually active are ceftriaxone and doxycycline. Among those who are older, ofloxacin may be used. Complications include infertility and chronic pain. People aged 15 to 35 are most commonly affected, with about 600,000 people within this age group affected per year in the United States.

== Signs and symptoms ==
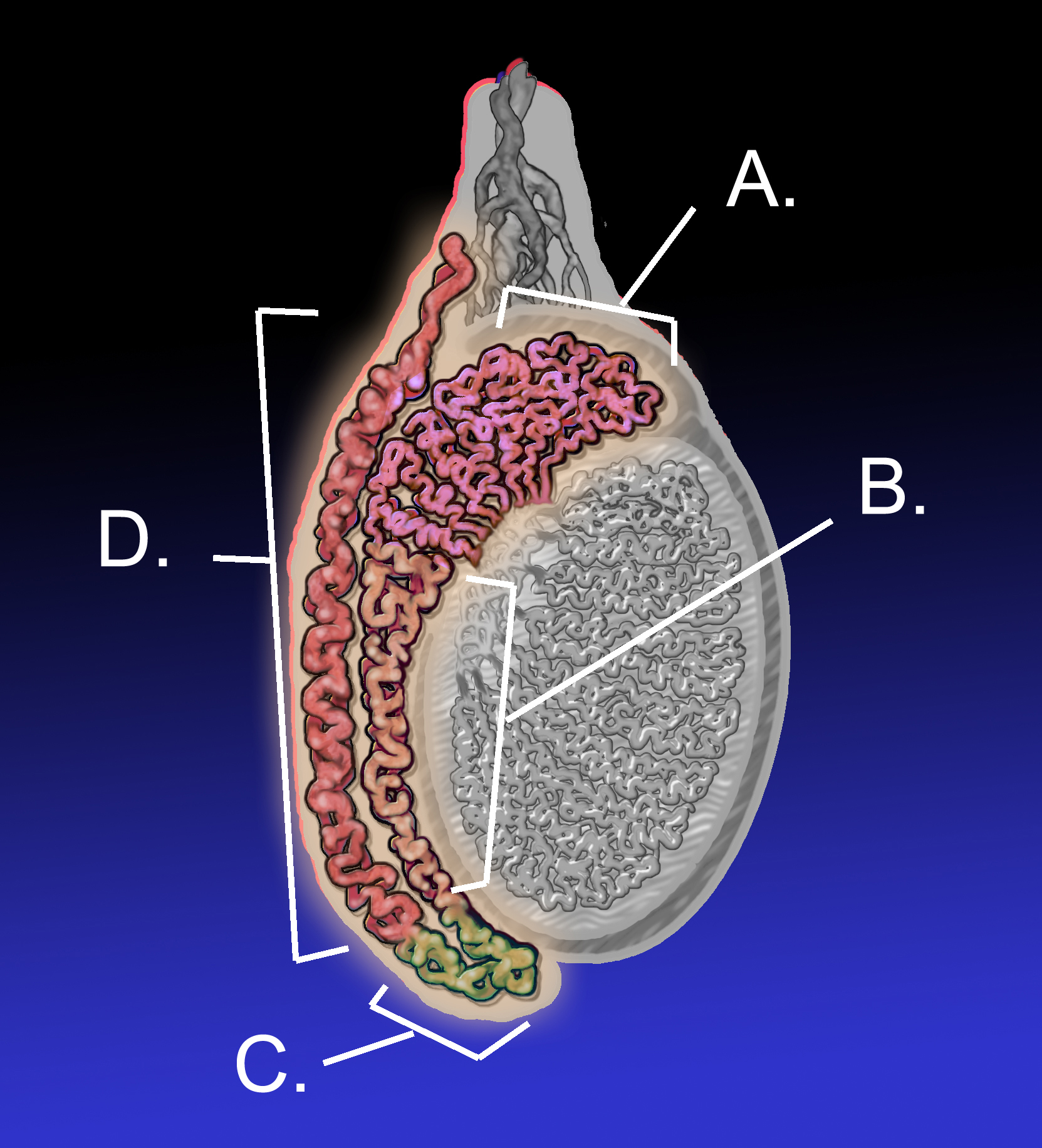
Adult human testicle with epididymis: A. Head of epididymis, B. Body of epididymis, C. Tail of epididymis, and D. Vas deferens

Those aged 15 to 35 are most commonly affected. The acute form usually develops over several days, with pain and swelling frequently in only one testis, which will hang low in the scrotum. There will often be a recent history of dysuria or urethral discharge. Fever is also a common symptom. In the chronic version, the patient may have painful point tenderness but may or may not have an irregular epididymis upon palpation, though palpation may reveal an indurated epididymis. A scrotal ultrasound may reveal problems with the epididymis, but such an ultrasound may also show nothing unusual. The majority of patients who present with chronic epididymitis have had symptoms for over five years.

=== Complications ===
Untreated, acute epididymitis's major complications are abscess formation and testicular infarction. Chronic epididymitis can lead to permanent damage or even destruction of the epididymis and testicle (resulting in infertility and/or hypogonadism), and infection may spread to any other organ or system of the body. Chronic pain is also an associated complication for untreated chronic epididymitis.

== Causes ==
Though urinary tract infections in men are rare, bacterial infection is the most common cause of acute epididymitis. The bacteria in the urethra back-track through the urinary and reproductive structures to the epididymis. In rare circumstances, the infection reaches the epididymis via the bloodstream.

In sexually active men, Chlamydia trachomatis is responsible for two-thirds of acute cases, followed by Neisseria gonorrhoeae and E. coli (or other bacteria that cause urinary tract infection). Particularly among men over age 35 in whom the cause is E. coli, epididymitis is commonly due to urinary tract obstruction. Less common microbes include Ureaplasma, Mycobacterium, and cytomegalovirus, or Cryptococcus in patients with HIV infection. E. coli is more common in boys before puberty, the elderly, and men who have sex with men. In the majority of cases in which bacteria are the cause, only one side of the scrotum or the other is the locus of pain.

Non-infectious causes are also possible. Reflux of sterile urine (urine without bacteria) through the ejaculatory ducts may cause inflammation with obstruction. In children, it may be a response following infection with enterovirus, adenovirus, or Mycoplasma pneumoniae. Rare non-infectious causes of chronic epididymitis include sarcoidosis (more prevalent in black men) and Behçet's disease.

Any form of epididymitis can be caused by genito-urinary surgery, including prostatectomy and urinary catheterization. Congestive epididymitis is a long-term complication of vasectomy. Chemical epididymitis may also result from drugs such as amiodarone.

== Diagnosis ==
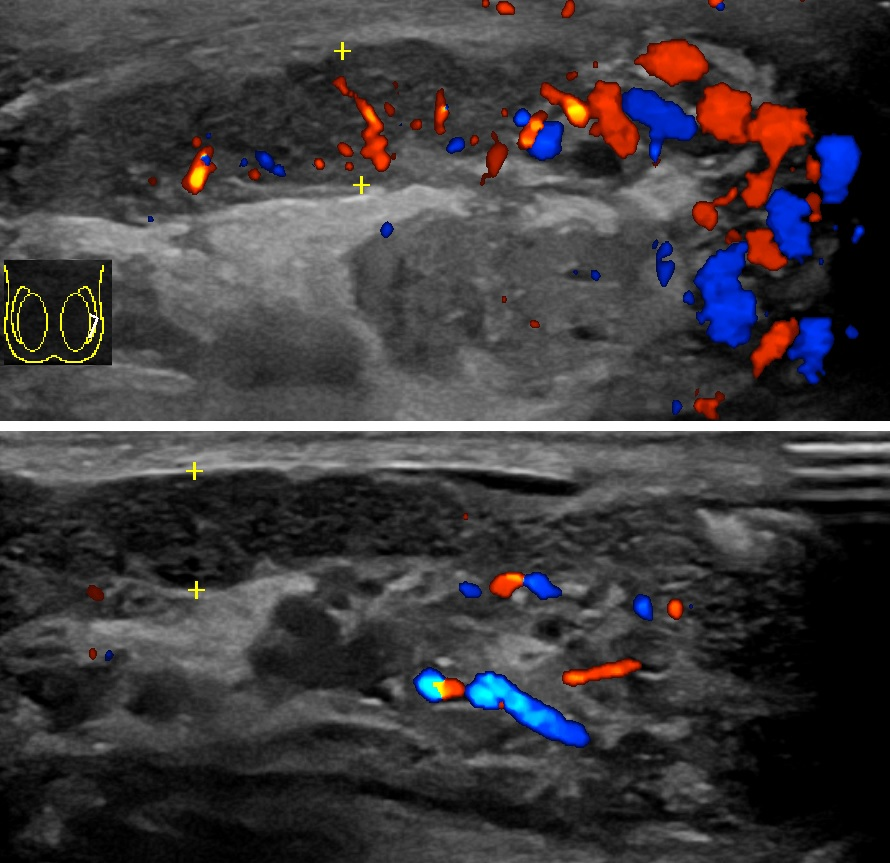
Doppler ultrasound of epididymitis, seen as a substantial increase in blood flow in the left epididymis (top image), while it is normal in the right (bottom image). The thickness of the epididymis (between yellow crosses) is only slightly increased.

Diagnosis is typically based on symptoms. Conditions that may result in similar symptoms include testicular torsion, inguinal hernia, and testicular cancer. Ultrasound can be useful if the diagnosis is unclear.

Epididymitis usually has a gradual onset. Typical findings are redness, warmth, and swelling of the scrotum, with tenderness behind the testicle, away from the middle (this is the normal position of the epididymis relative to the testicle). The cremasteric reflex (elevation of the testicle in response to stroking the upper inner thigh) remains normal. This is a useful sign to distinguish it from testicular torsion. If there is pain relieved by elevation of the testicle, this is called Prehn's sign, which is, however, non-specific and is not useful for diagnosis. Before the advent of sophisticated medical imaging techniques, surgical exploration was the standard of care. Today, Doppler ultrasound is a common test: it can demonstrate areas of blood flow and can distinguish clearly between epididymitis and torsion. However, as torsion and other sources of testicular pain can often be determined by palpation alone, some studies have suggested that the only real benefit of an ultrasound is to assure the person that they do not have testicular cancer. Nuclear testicular blood flow testing is rarely used.

Additional tests may be necessary to identify underlying causes. In younger children, a urinary tract anomaly is frequently found. In sexually active men, tests for sexually transmitted infections may be done. These may include microscopy and culture of a first void urine sample, Gram stain and culture of fluid or a swab from the urethra, nucleic acid amplification tests (to amplify and detect microbial DNA or other nucleic acids) or tests for syphilis and HIV.

=== Classification ===
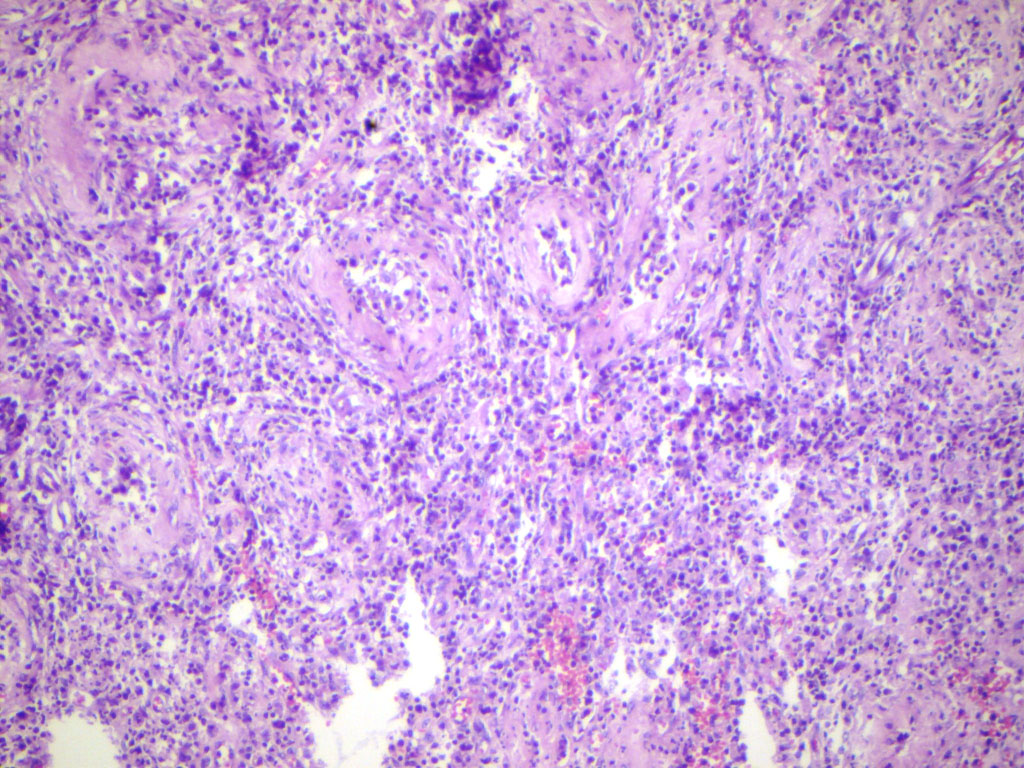
Histopathology image of inflamed epididymis and testis

Epididymitis can be classified as acute, subacute, and chronic, depending on the duration of symptoms.

==== Chronic epididymitis ====
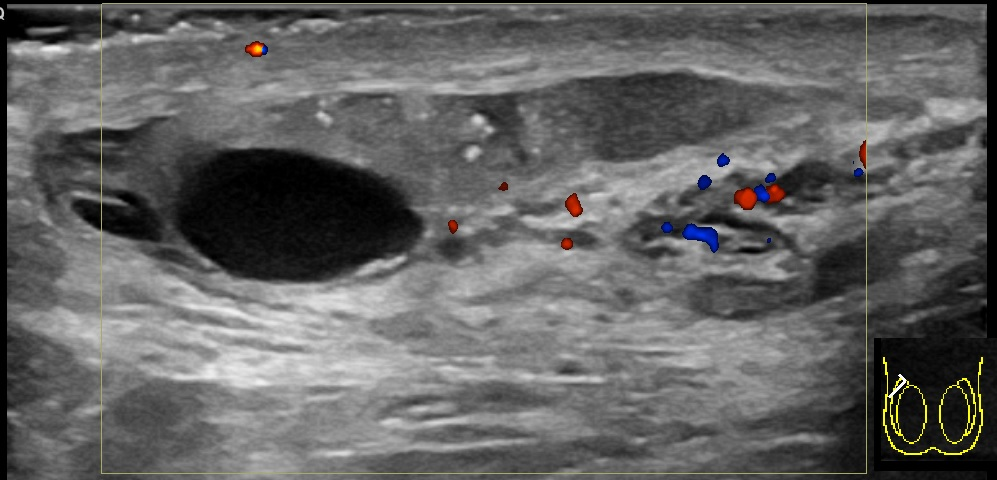
Scrotal ultrasound showing calcifications and cysts in a case of chronic epididymis.

Chronic epididymitis is a form of epididymitis that persists for more than three months. Chronic epididymitis is characterized by inflammation even when there is no infection present. Tests are needed to distinguish chronic epididymitis from a range of other disorders that can cause constant scrotal pain, including testicular cancer (though this is often painless), enlarged scrotal veins (varicocele), calcifications, and a possible cyst within the epididymis. Some research has found that as much as 80% of visits to a urologist for scrotal pain are for chronic epididymitis. As a further complication, the nerves in the scrotal area are closely connected to those of the abdomen, sometimes causing abdominal pain similar to a hernia (see referred pain).

Chronic epididymitis is most commonly associated with lower back pain, and the onset of pain often co-occurs with activity that stresses the low back (i.e., heavy lifting, long periods of car driving, poor posture while sitting, or any other activity that interferes with the normal curve of the lumbar lordosis region).

== Treatment ==
In both the acute and chronic forms, antibiotics are used if an infection is suspected. The treatment of choice is often azithromycin and cefixime to cover both gonorrhoeae and chlamydia. Fluoroquinolones are no longer recommended due to widespread resistance of gonorrhoeae to this class. Doxycycline may be used as an alternative to azithromycin. In chronic epididymitis, a four- to six-week course of antibiotics may be prescribed to ensure the complete eradication of any possible bacterial cause, especially the various chlamydiae.

For cases caused by enteric organisms (such as E. coli), ofloxacin or levofloxacin are recommended.

In children, fluoroquinolones and doxycycline are best avoided. Since bacteria that cause urinary tract infections are often the cause of epididymitis in children, co-trimoxazole or suited penicillins (for example, cephalexin) can be used.

Household remedies such as elevation of the scrotum and cold compresses applied regularly to the scrotum may relieve the pain in acute cases. Painkillers or anti-inflammatory drugs are often used for the treatment of both chronic and acute forms. Hospitalisation is indicated for severe cases, and check-ups can ensure the infection has cleared up. Surgical removal of the epididymis is rarely necessary, causes sterility, and only gives relief from pain in approximately 50% of cases. However, in acute suppurating epididymitis (acute epididymitis with a discharge of pus), an epididymotomy may be recommended; in refractory cases, a full epididymectomy may be required. In cases with unrelenting testicular pain, removal of the entire testicle—orchiectomy—may also be warranted.

It is generally believed that most cases of chronic epididymitis will eventually "burn out" of the patient's system if left untreated, though this might take years or even decades. However, some prostate-related medications have proven effective in treating chronic epididymitis, including doxazosin.

== Epidemiology ==
Epididymitis makes up 1 in 144 visits for medical care (0.69 percent) in men 18 to 50 years old, or 600,000 cases in males between 18 and 35 in the United States.

It occurs primarily in individuals aged 16 to 30 and 51 to 70 years. As of 2008, there appears to be an increase in incidence in the United States that parallels an increase in reported cases of chlamydia and gonorrhea.
