= Testicular nubbin =

A testicular nubbin is the residual tissue of the human testis after a supposed perinatal vascular accident involving the testicular blood supply. The blood supply of the testis twists (called torsion) thereby cutting off the blood supply to the testis and results in testicular atrophy (shrinking). The nubbin is usually identified in childhood by the absence of a palpable testis in the scrotal sac. The tissue remnant usually includes fibrous tissue and signs of old infarction with hemosiderin deposition identified histologically. There is some disagreement as to whether these should be removed and whether there is a risk of future malignancy. They are typically removed surgically by pediatric urologists or pediatric general surgeons through either a scrotal or inguinal (or both) incision.
