= Cremasteric reflex =

Human reflex affecting the testicles

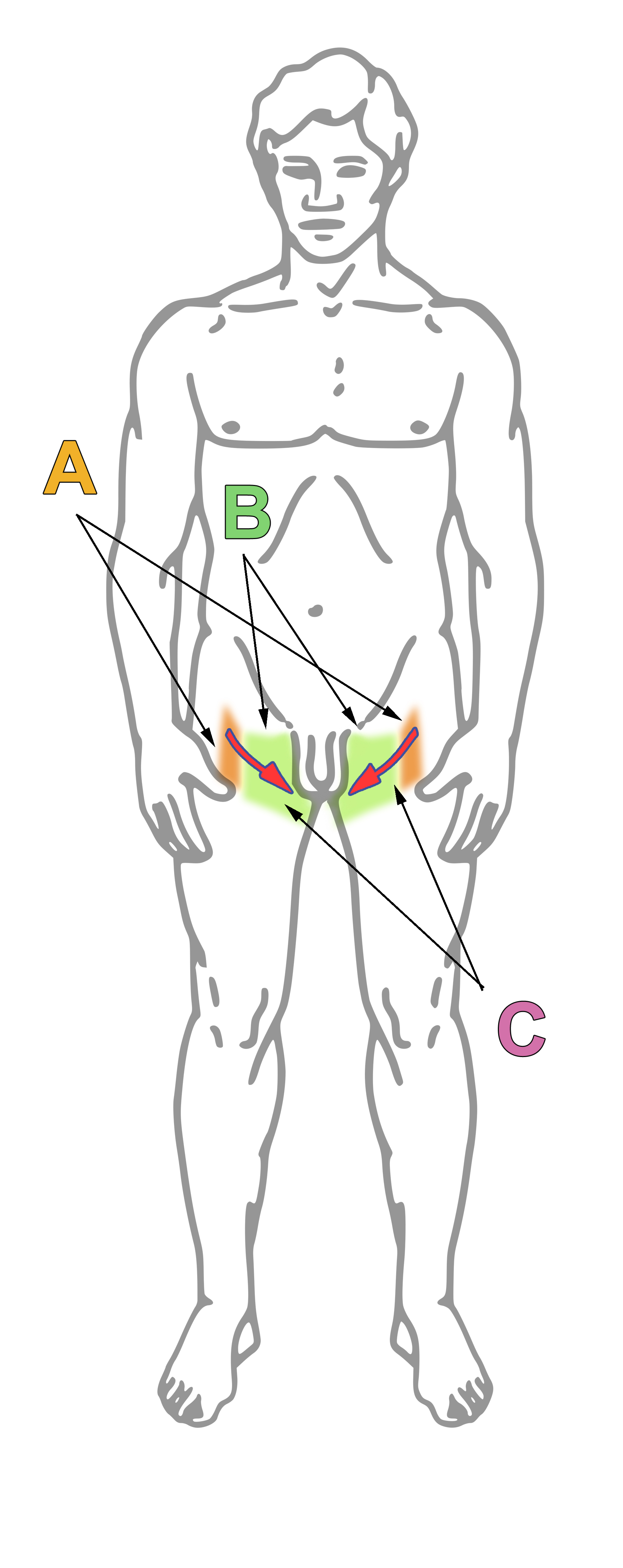
Area A (in orange) represents the area of sensory fibers controlled by the genitofemoral nerve; area B (in green) represents that controlled by the ilioinguinal nerve; arrow C (in red with blue outline) shows the location where the skin must be stroked to elicit this reflex.

Cremasteric reflex

The cremasteric reflex is a superficial (i.e., close to the skin's surface) reflex observed in the human cremaster muscle and testicle.

This reflex is elicited by lightly stroking or poking the superior and medial (inner) part of the thigh—regardless of the direction of stroke. The normal response is an immediate contraction of the cremaster muscle that pulls up the testicle ipsilaterally (on the same side of the body). The reflex utilizes sensory and motor fibers from two different nerves. When the inner thigh is stroked, sensory fibers of the ilioinguinal nerve are stimulated. These activate the motor fibers of the genital branch of the genitofemoral nerve which causes the cremaster muscle to contract and elevate the testis.

== Clinical conditions ==
In some males, this reflex may be exaggerated, which can occasionally lead to a misdiagnosis of cryptorchidism.

The cremasteric reflex may be absent with testicular torsion, upper and lower motor neuron disorders, as well as a spine injury of L1-L2. Its absence can also occur if the ilioinguinal nerve has accidentally been cut during a hernia repair.

The cremasteric reflex can be helpful in recognizing testicular emergencies. The presence of the cremasteric reflex does not eliminate testicular torsion from a differential diagnosis, but it does broaden the possibilities to include epididymitis or other causes of scrotal and testicular pain. In any event, if testicular torsion cannot be definitively eliminated in an expeditious manner, a testicular Doppler ultrasound or exploratory surgical intervention is usually implemented to prevent possible loss of the testicle to necrosis.
