= Orchitis =

Inflammation of the testicles

- Other names: Orchiditis
- Pronunciation: /ˌɔːrˈkaɪtɪs/, /ˌɔːrkɪˈdaɪtɪs/
- Specialty: Urology

Orchitis is inflammation of the testicles. It can also involve swelling, pains, and frequent infection, particularly of the epididymis, as in epididymitis. The term is from the Ancient Greek ὄρχις meaning "testicle"; same root as orchid.

== Signs and symptoms ==
Symptoms of orchitis are similar to those of testicular torsion. These can include:

- hematospermia (blood in the semen)
- hematuria (blood in the urine)
- severe pain
- visible swelling of a testicle or testicles and often the inguinal lymph nodes on the affected side.

== Causes ==
Orchitis can be related to epididymitis infection that has spread to the testicles (then called "epididymo-orchitis"), sometimes caused by the sexually transmitted infections chlamydia and gonorrhea. It has also been reported in cases of males infected with brucellosis. Orchitis can also be seen during active mumps, particularly in adolescent boys.

Ischemic orchitis may result from damage to the blood vessels of the spermatic cord during inguinal herniorrhaphy, and may in the worst event lead to testicular atrophy.

== Diagnosis ==
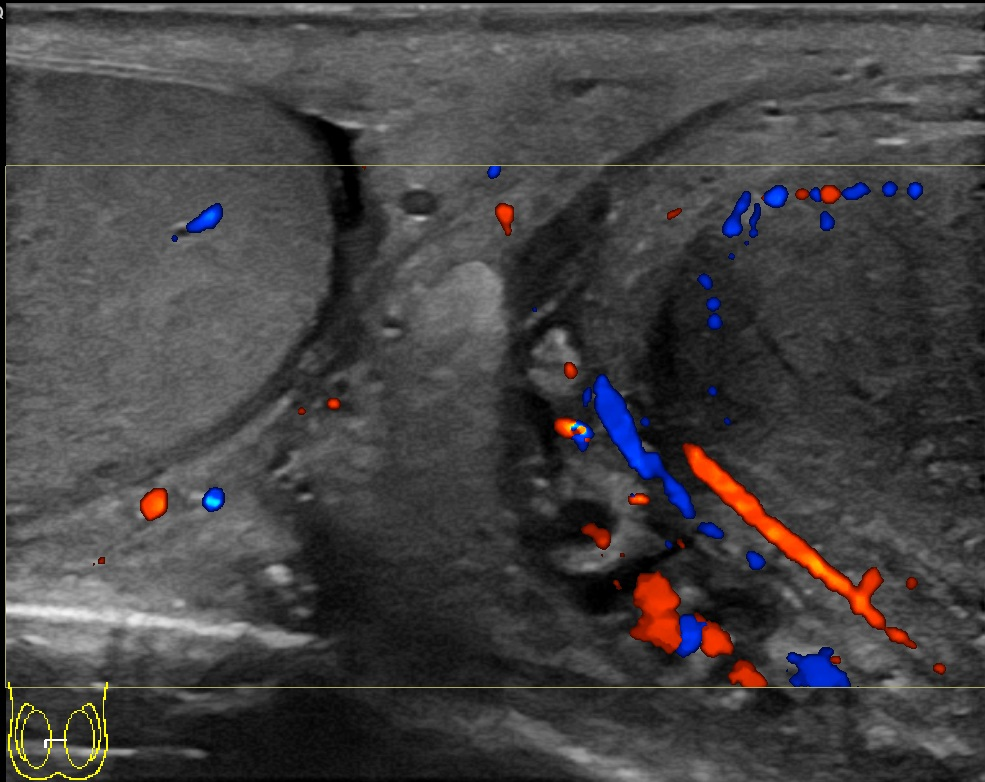
Doppler ultrasound of the scrotum, in the axial plane, showing orchitis (as part of epididymo-orchitis) as hypoechogenic and slightly heterogenic left testicular tissue (right in image), with an increased blood flow. There is also swelling of peritesticular tissue.

- Blood – ESR high
- Urine – Cultural & Sensitivity test
- Ultrasound scanning

== Treatment ==
In most cases where orchitis is caused by epididymitis, treatment is an oral antibiotic such as cefalexin or ciprofloxacin until the infection clears up. In both causes non-steroidal anti-inflammatory drugs such as naproxen or ibuprofen are recommended to relieve pain. Sometimes stronger pain medications in the opiate category are called for and are frequently prescribed by experienced emergency department physicians.

== Other animals ==
Orchitis has also been described in roosters.
