= Post-vasectomy pain syndrome =

Chronic genital pain condition following vasectomy

Post-vasectomy pain syndrome (PVPS) is a chronic and sometimes debilitating genital pain condition that may develop immediately or several years after vasectomy. Because this condition is a syndrome, there is no single treatment method, therefore efforts focus on mitigating/relieving the individual patient's specific pain. When pain in the epididymides is the primary symptom, post-vasectomy pain syndrome is often described as congestive epididymitis.

== Incidence ==
In their Vasectomy Guideline (2015), the American Urological Association stated:

The opinion of the Panel is that the most important information for patient counseling is the risk of chronic scrotal pain which is severe enough to cause the patient to seek medical attention and/or to interfere with quality of life. The most robust study of this indicates a 0.9% rate of such a pain seven months after the surgery. Only three studies reported follow-up of three years or more regarding severe chronic scrotal pain after vasectomy. One group reported in a single-group retrospective study that at 4.8 years of follow-up, 2.2% of vasectomized men reported chronic scrotal pain sufficient to exert an adverse impact on quality of life. An additional group reported in a prospective single-cohort design with four years of follow-up that 5% of vasectomized men sought medical attention because of testicular pain. In the sole comparative study, at 3.9 years of follow-up 6.0% of vasectomized men reported pain severe enough to motivate the seeking of medical care compared to 2.0% of non-vasectomized men.

The opinion of the Panel is that chronic scrotal pain severe enough to interfere with quality of life occurs in 1-2% of men after vasectomy. Medical or surgical therapy is usually, but not always, effective in improving this chronic pain.

An investigation of peer-reviewed articles published in March 2020 examined 559 articles, performed meta-analysis on 25 separate datasets, and concluded that the incidence of post-vasectomy pain syndrome is 5% (95% CI 3% to 8%) with similar incidence of PVPS for both the scalpel and the no-scalpel technique.

== Symptoms ==
- Persistent pain in the genitalia and/or genital area(s)
- Groin pain upon physical exertion
- Pain when achieving an erection and/or engaging in sexual intercourse
- Pain upon ejaculation
- Loss of erectile function

Any of the aforementioned pain conditions/syndromes can persist for years after vasectomy. The pain can range from mild/annoying to extremely debilitating, with a continuum of pain severity between these two extremes. Pain is thought to be caused by any of the following, either singularly or in combination: testicular back pressure, overfull epididymides, chronic inflammation, fibrosis, sperm granulomas, and nerve entrapment. Pain can be present continuously in the form of orchialgia and/or congestive epididymitis or it can be situational, such as pain during intercourse, ejaculation or physical exertion.

== Mechanisms of pain ==
There is a noticeable enlargement of the epididymides in vasectomized men. Sperm sometimes leak from the vas deferens of vasectomized men, forming lesions in the scrotum known as sperm granulomas. Some sperm granulomas can be painful. The presence of a sperm granuloma at the vasectomy site prevents epididymal pressure build-up, perforation, and the formation of an epididymal sperm granuloma. It thus lessens the likelihood of epididymal discomfort.

One study using ultrasound found that the epididymides of patients with post-vasectomy pain syndrome were enlarged and full of cystic growths.

== Treatment ==
Treatment depends on the proximate cause. In one study, it was reported that 9 of 13 men who underwent vasectomy reversal in an attempt to relieve post-vasectomy pain syndrome became pain-free, though the followup was only one month in some cases. Another study found that 24 of 32 men had relief after vasectomy reversal.

Nerve entrapment is treated with surgery to free the nerve from the scar tissue, or to cut the nerve. One study reported that denervation of the spermatic cord provided complete relief at the first follow-up visit in 13 of 17 cases, and that the other four patients reported improvement. As nerves may regrow, long-term studies are needed.

One study found that epididymectomy provided relief for 50% of patients with post-vasectomy pain syndrome.

Orchiectomy is recommended usually only after other surgeries have failed.
