= Epididymis =

Tube that connects a testicle to a vas deferens

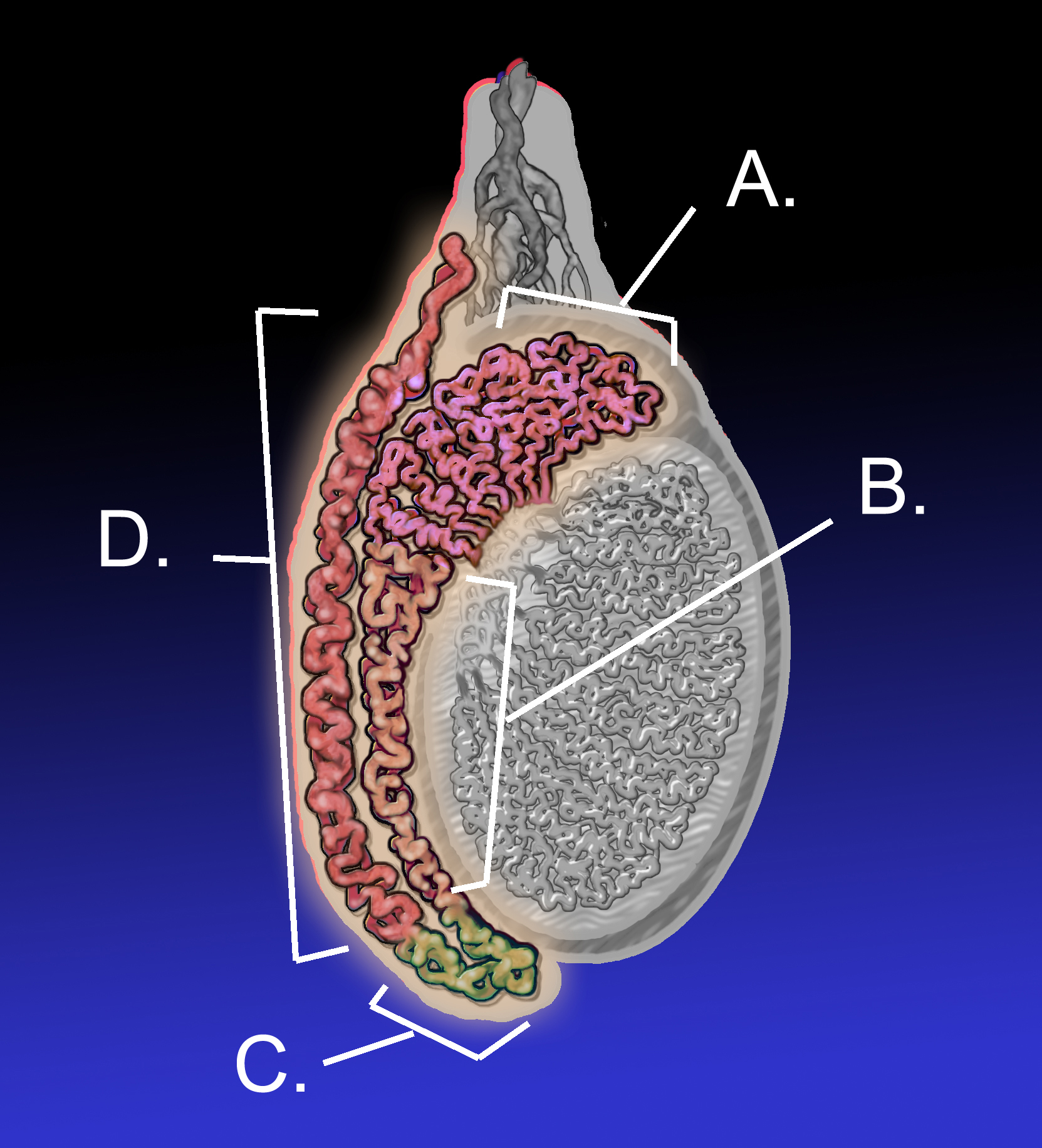
- Adult human testicle with epididymis highlighted: A. Head of epididymis, B. Body of epididymis, C. Tail of epididymis, and D. Vas deferens

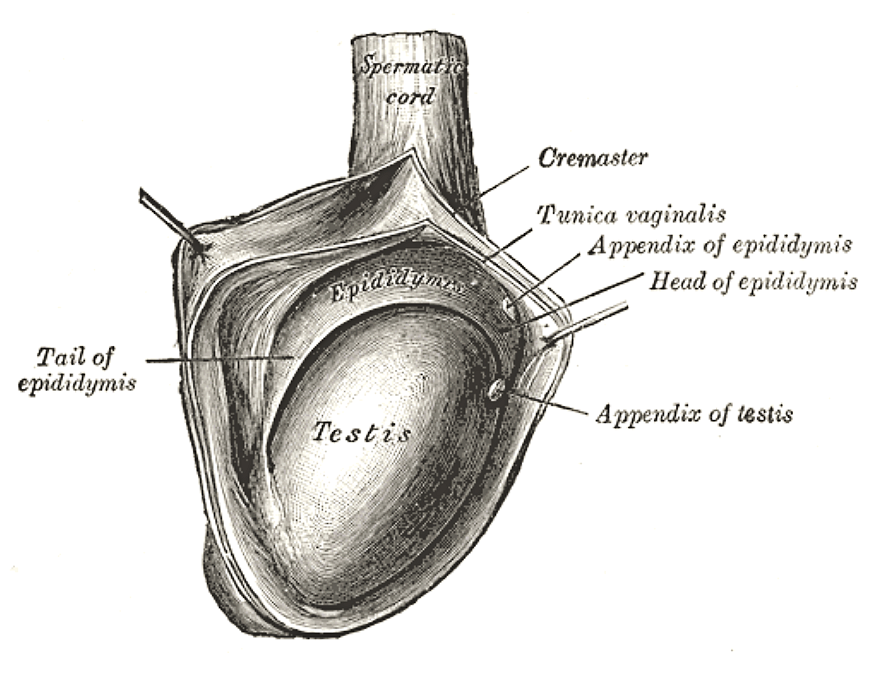
- The right testicle, exposed by laying open the tunica vaginalis.

Details
- Precursor: Mesonephric ducts
- Vein: Pampiniform plexus
- Nerve: pelvic, hypogastric nerve, and pudendal nerve

Identifiers
- Latin: epididymis
- Greek: ἐπιδιδυμίς
- MeSH: D004822
- TA98: A09.3.02.001
- TA2: 3603
- FMA: 18255

The epididymis (/ɛpɪˈdɪdɪmɪs/; pl.: epididymides /ɛpɪdɪˈdɪmədiːz/ or /ɛpɪˈdɪdəmɪdiːz/) is an elongated tubular genital organ attached to the posterior side of each one of the two male reproductive glands, the testicles. It is a single, narrow, tightly coiled tube which, in adult humans, is about 6 to 7 centimetres (2.4 to 2.8 in) in length; uncoiled, the tube would be approximately 6 m (20 feet) long. The epididymis connects the testicle to the vas deferens in the male reproductive system. The epididymis serves as an interconnection between the multiple efferent ducts at the rear of a testicle (proximally), and the vas deferens (distally). Its primary function is the storage, maturation, and transport of sperm.

== Structure ==
The human epididymis is situated posterior and somewhat lateral to the testis. The epididymis is invested completely by the tunica vaginalis (which is continuous with the tunica vaginalis covering the testis).

The epididymis can be divided into three main regions:

- The head (Latin: caput). The head of the epididymis receives spermatozoa via the efferent ducts of the mediastinum of the testis at the superior pole of the testis. The head is characterized histologically by a thick epithelium with long stereocilia (described below) and a little smooth muscle. It is involved in absorbing fluid to make the sperm more concentrated. The concentration of the sperm here is dilute.
- The body (Latin: corpus). This has an intermediate epithelium and smooth muscle thickness.
- The tail (Latin: cauda). This has the thinnest epithelium of the three regions and the greatest quantity of smooth muscle. The tail is distally continuous with (the convoluted portion of) the ductus deferens (s. vas deferens).

== Histology ==
The epididymis is covered by a two-layered pseudostratified epithelium. The epithelium is separated by a basement membrane from the connective tissue wall, which has smooth muscle cells. The major cell types in the epithelium are:

- Principal cells: columnar cells that, with the basal cells, form the majority of the epithelium. In the caput (head) region, these cells have long stereocilia that are tuft-like extensions that project into the lumen. The stereocilia are much shorter in the cauda (tail) segment. They also secrete carnitine, sialic acid, glycoproteins, and glycerylphosphorylcholine into the lumen.
- Basal cells: shorter, pyramid-shaped cells, which contact the basal lamina but taper off before their apical surfaces reach the lumen. These are thought to be undifferentiated precursors of principal cells.
- Apical cells: predominantly found in the head region
- Clear cells: predominant in the tail region
- Intraepithelial lymphocytes: distributed throughout the tissue.
- Intraepithelial macrophages

=== Stereocilia ===
The stereocilia of the epididymis are long cytoplasmic projections that have an actin filament backbone. These filaments have been visualized at high resolution using fluorescent phalloidin that binds to actin filaments. The stereocilia in the epididymis are non-motile. These membrane extensions increase the surface area of the cell, allowing for greater absorption and secretion. It has been shown that the epithelial sodium channel ENaC that allows the flow of Na^{+} ions into the cell is localized on stereocilia.

Because sperm are initially non-motile as they leave the seminiferous tubules, large volumes of fluid are secreted to propel them to the epididymis. The core function of the stereocilia is to resorb 90% of this fluid as the spermatozoa start to become motile. This absorption creates a fluid current that moves the immobile sperm from the seminiferous tubules to the epididymis. Spermatozoa only reach full motility when inside a vagina, where the alkaline pH is neutralized by acidic vaginal fluids.

== Development ==
In the embryo, the epididymis develops from tissue that once formed the mesonephros, a primitive kidney found in many aquatic vertebrates. Persistence of the cranial end of the mesonephric duct will leave behind a remnant called the appendix of the epididymis. In addition, some mesonephric tubules can persist as the paradidymis, a small body caudal to the efferent ductules.

The epoophoron is a homologous remnant in the female.

== Function ==
=== Role in storage of sperm and ejaculate ===
Spermatozoa formed in the testis enter the caput epididymidis, progress to the corpus, and finally reach the cauda region, where they are stored. Sperm entering the caput epididymidis are incomplete—they cannot swim forward (motility) nor fertilize an egg. Epididymal transit takes 2 to 6 days in humans and 10 to 13 days in rodents. During their transit in the epididymis, sperm undergo maturation processes necessary for them to acquire motility and fertility. Final maturation (capacitation) is completed in the female reproductive tract.

The epididymis secretes immobilin, a large glycoprotein that is responsible for creating the viscoelastic luminal environment that serves to mechanically immobilize spermatozoa until ejaculation. Immobilin is predominantly secreted into the proximal caput epididymidis before the acquisition of the potential for sperm motility.

During emission, sperm flow from the cauda epididymis (which functions as a storage reservoir) into the vas deferens where they are propelled by the peristaltic action of muscle layers in the wall of the vas deferens, and are mixed with the diluting fluids of the prostate, seminal vesicles, and other accessory glands before ejaculation (forming semen).

Contrary to popular belief, sperm are capable of causing a pregnancy even without ever travelling through the epididymis. This has been proven in two cases in the United States in the 1980s where a couple of men's vasa deferentia were directly surgically attached to their efferent ducts and these men both subsequently impregnated their partners within the next couple of years. This has also been proven in a similar case in Western Europe in the early 1990s.

=== Antioxidant defenses ===
During their transit through the epididymis, the spermatozoa undergo a series of transformations in preparation for their ultimate task of fertilizing the oocyte. To protect the spermatozoa during their transit through the epididymis, the epididymal epithelium produces a variety of antioxidant proteins that help protect the spermatozoa from oxidative damage. The antioxidant proteins produced include catalase, glutathione peroxidases, glutathione-S-transferases, peroxiredoxins, superoxide dismutases, thioredoxin reductase and thioredoxins. Deficiencies in the availability of these antioxidant proteins reduces sperm quality by affecting a variety of the proteins necessary for the motility needed to fertilize oocytes. Reduced antioxidant activity also causes increased oxidative damage to the sperm DNA.

== Clinical significance ==
=== Inflammation ===
An inflammation of the epididymis is called epididymitis. It is much more common than testicular inflammation, termed orchitis.

=== Surgical removal ===
Epididymotomy is the placement of an incision into the epididymis and is sometimes considered a treatment option for acute suppurating epididymitis.

Epididymectomy is the surgical removal of the epididymis, sometimes performed for post-vasectomy pain syndrome and for refractory cases of epididymitis.

Epididymectomy is also performed for sterilization on some male animals of livestock species so they can be used to detect estrus in females ready for artificial insemination.

== Evolutionary history ==
The epididymis is present in male reptiles, birds, mammals, and cartilaginous fish. The caput epididymidis is fused to the testis in eutherian mammals, but not in marsupials.

In reptiles, there is an additional canal between the testis and the head of the epididymis, which receives the various efferent ducts. This is, however, absent in all birds and mammals.

== Gallery ==
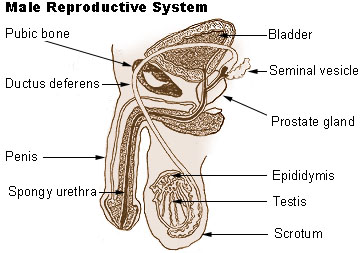
Human male reproductive system

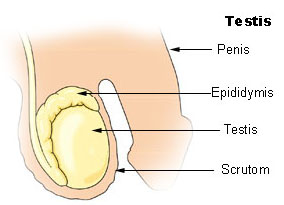
Testis

Schematic drawing: cross-section through a testicle

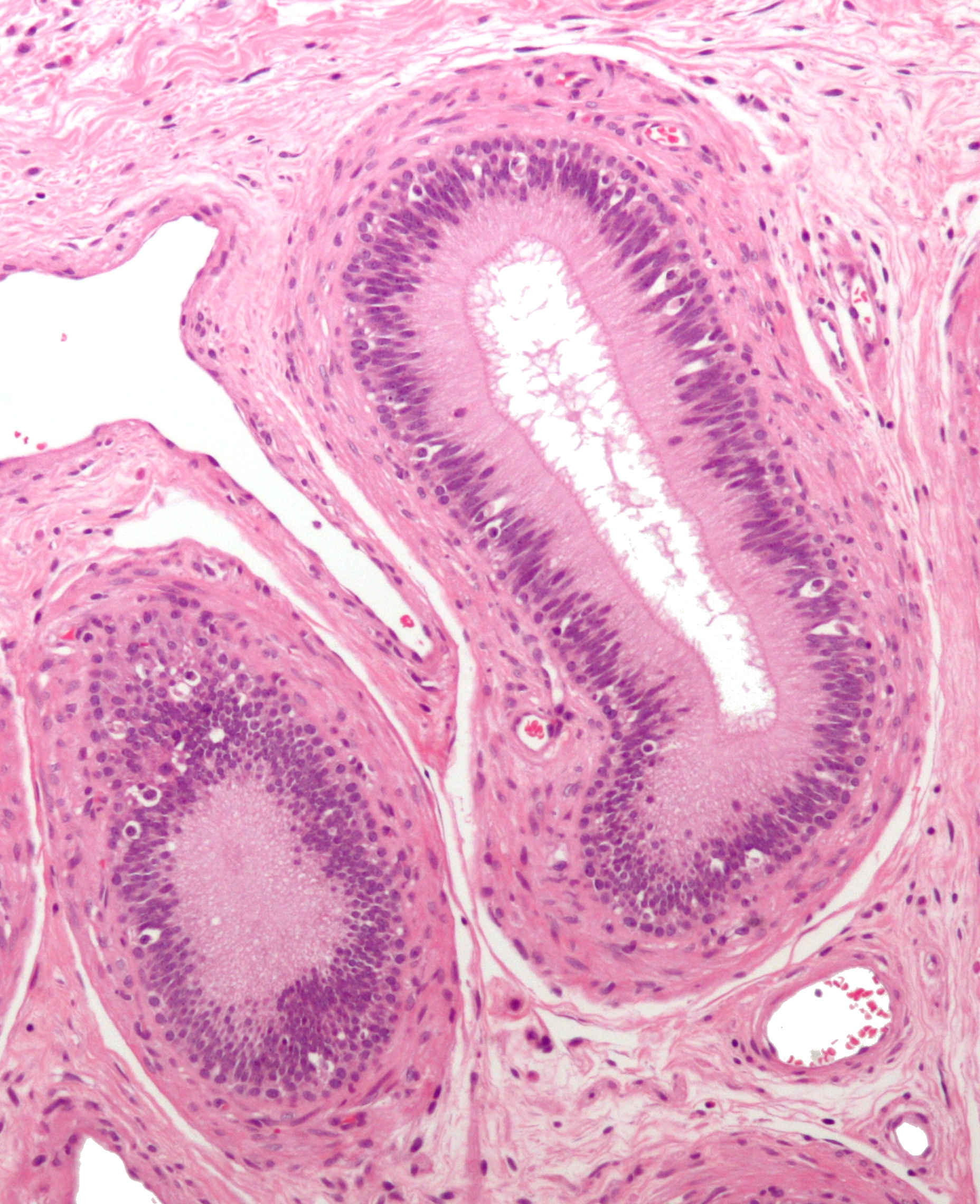
Micrograph of epididymis - H&E stain

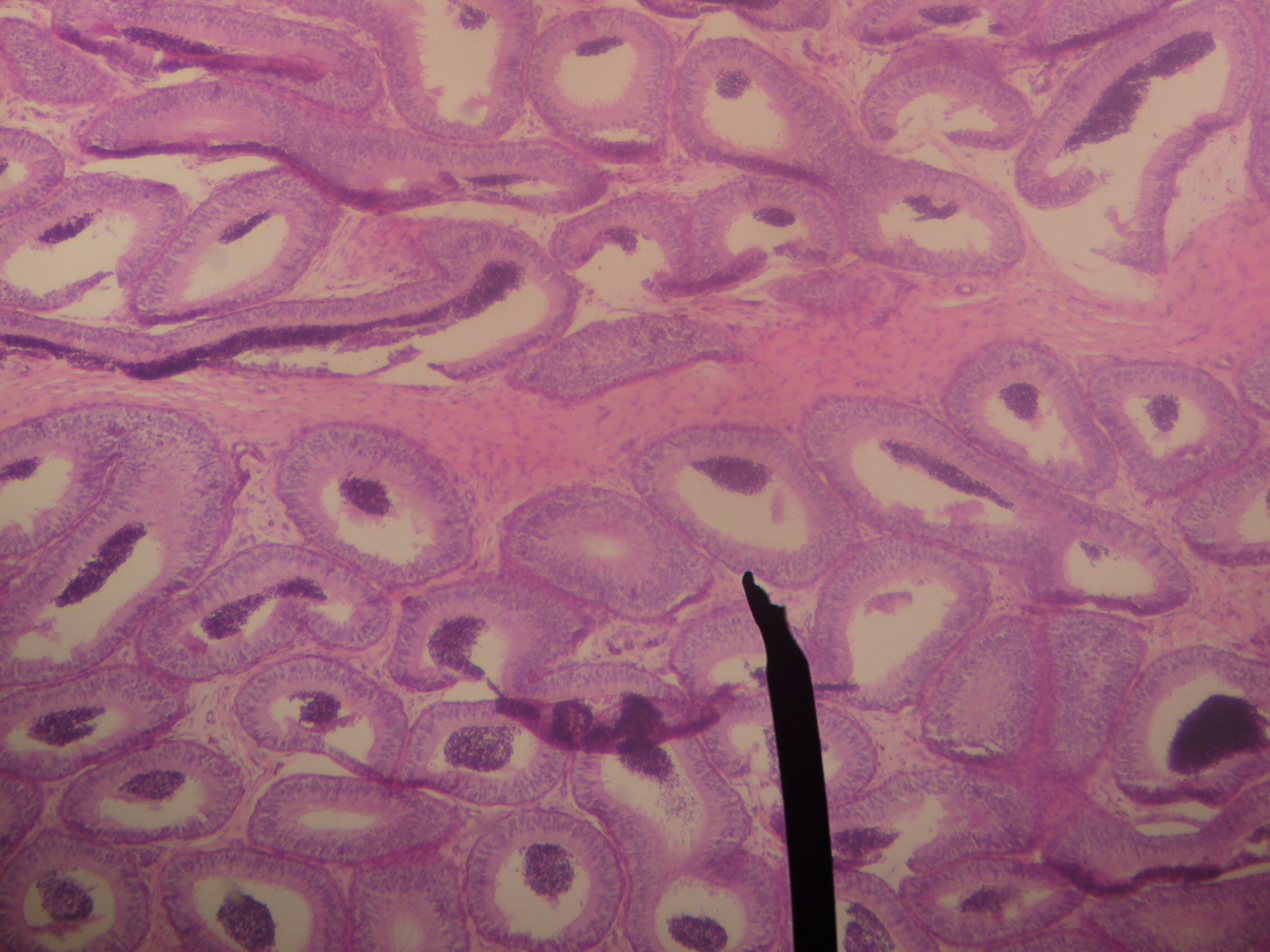
Micrograph

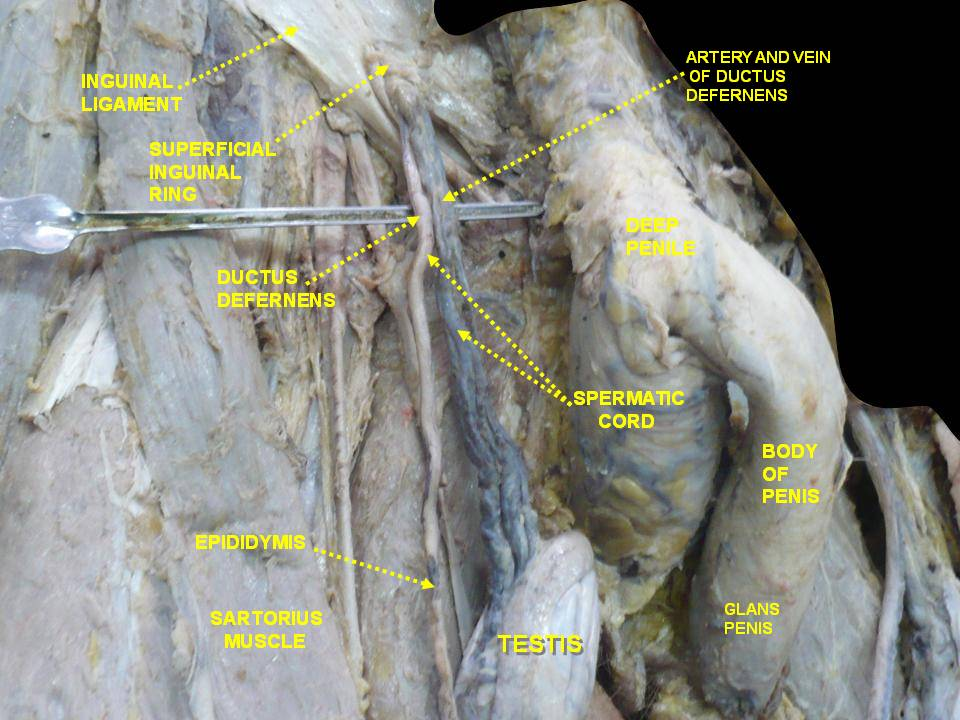
Deep dissection of epididymis

== See also ==
- Epididymal hypertension – Condition that arises during human sexual arousal when seminal fluid is not ejaculated
- List of distinct cell types in the adult human body
