= Orchiectomy =

Surgical removal of one or both testicles

- Diagram of the incisions in an orchiectomy
- Other names: Orchidectomy
- Specialty: Urology

Orchiectomy (also named orchidectomy) is a surgical procedure in which one or both testicles are removed. The surgery can be performed for various reasons:

- treatment for testicular cancer
- as part of gender-affirming surgery for transgender women and non-binary people
- as management for advanced prostate cancer
- to remove damaged testes after testicular torsion.
- after a trauma or complex rupture of the tunica albuginea.
- as a treatment for post-vasectomy pain syndrome.

Less frequently, orchiectomy may be performed following a trauma, or due to wasting away of one or more testicles.

== Procedure ==
=== Simple orchiectomy ===
A simple orchiectomy is commonly performed as part of gender-affirming surgery for transgender women and non-binary people, or as palliative treatment for advanced cases of prostate cancer. A simple orchiectomy may also be required in the event of testicular torsion.

For the procedure, the person lies flat on an operating table with the penis taped against the abdomen. The nurse shaves a small area for the incision. After anesthetic has been administered, the surgeon makes an incision in the midpoint of the scrotum and cuts through the underlying tissue. The surgeon removes the testicles and parts of the spermatic cord through the incision. The incision is closed with two layers of sutures and is covered with a surgical dressing. If desired, prosthetic testicles can be inserted before the incision is closed to present an outward appearance of a pre-surgical scrotum.

=== Subcapsular orchiectomy ===
A subcapsular orchiectomy is also commonly performed for treatment of prostate cancer. The operation is similar to that of a simple orchiectomy, with the exception that the glandular tissue that surrounds each testicle is removed rather than the entire testis itself. This type of orchiectomy is performed to remove testosterone-producing glandular tissue while maintaining the appearance of an ordinary scrotum.

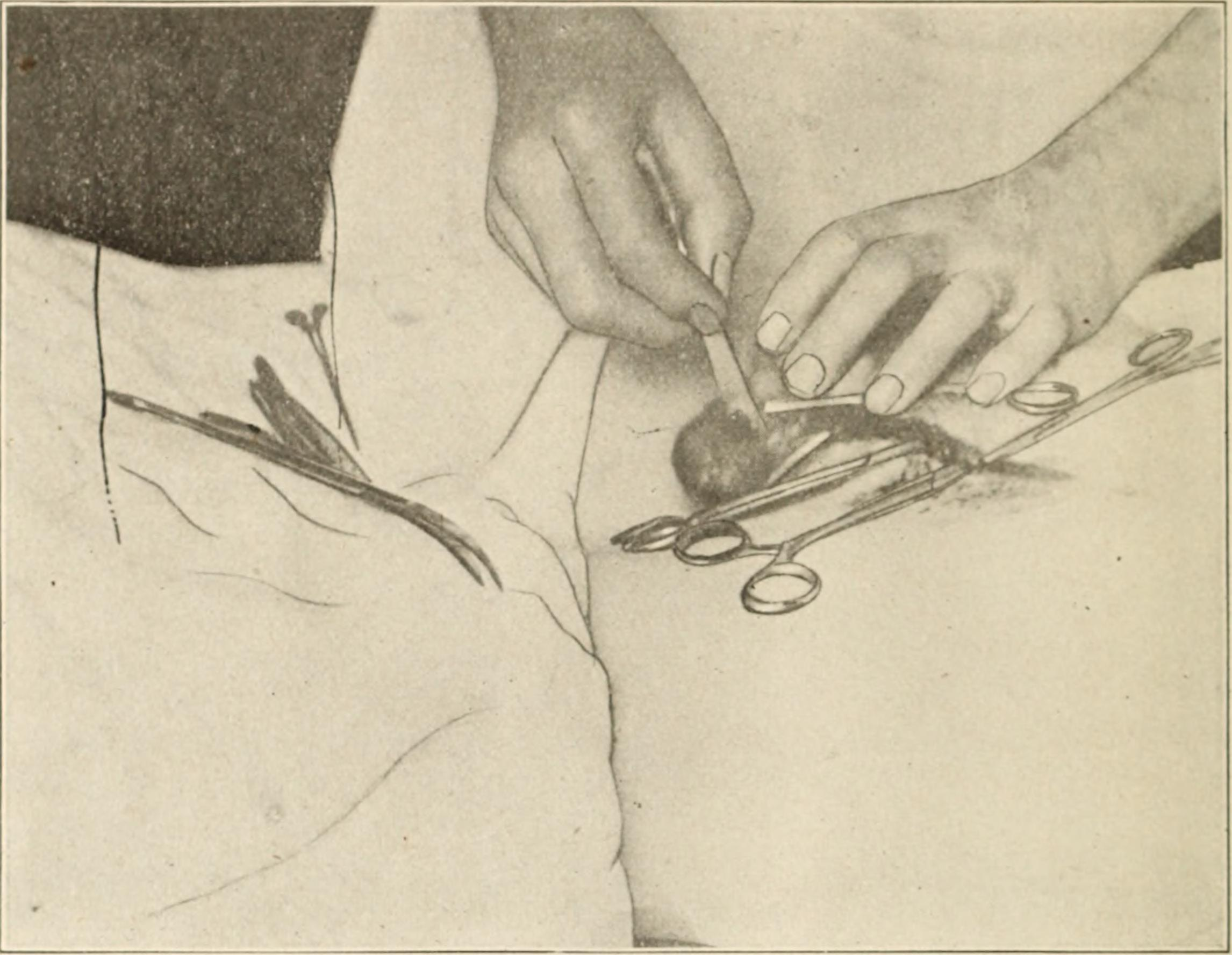
Inguinal orchiectomy being performed

=== Inguinal orchiectomy ===
Inguinal orchiectomy (named from the Latin inguen for "groin", and also called radical orchiectomy) is performed when an onset of testicular cancer is suspected, in order to prevent a possible spread of cancer from the spermatic cord into the lymph nodes near the kidneys.

An inguinal orchiectomy can be either unilateral (one testicle) or bilateral (both testicles). The surgeon makes an incision in the groin area (in contrast to an incision in the scrotum, as is done in both simple and subcapsular orchiectomies). The entire spermatic cord is removed, as well as the testicle(s). A long, non-absorbable suture may be left in the stump of the spermatic cord in case later surgery is deemed necessary. After the cord and testicle(s) have been removed, the surgeon washes the area with saline solution and closes the layers of tissues and skin with sutures. The wound is then covered with sterile gauze and bandaged.

=== Partial orchiectomy ===
Partial orchiectomy is an option for individuals with testicular masses that want to preserve their testes and their function. During surgery, the testis is exposed in a similar way to inguinal orchiectomy. Once the testis is exposed and the spermatic cord is clamped, there is a current debate as to whether surgeons should deliver cold ischaemia which means submitting the organ, in this case the testis, into a cold/freezing environment. Whether or not it is submerged and frozen, the next step is to cut the tunica vaginalis and an ultrasound is used to find the tumor. After, the tumor is scraped away from the testis in a process called enucleation. Following enucleation, biopsies are taken of the tissues surrounding the testicle where the mass once was. Afterwards, each layer or tunica of the testis is sutured up and the testis is placed back in the scrotum. The skin layers are also closed up with sutures.

== Pre-operative considerations ==
Guidelines state that fertility counseling should be offered to all patients undergoing inguinal orchiectomy, as there is a risk of reduced fertility or infertility. Testicular germ cell tumors (TGCT) accounts for 95% of cases of testicular cancer in young men. TGCT is associated with abnormal semen parameters. Because testicular cancer is commonly diagnosed in young, fertile men, it is critical that these individuals be educated on preserving their semen through freezing (cryopreservation) and complete a fertility assessment prior to surgery. In addition, testicular prosthesis placement counseling and education is encouraged to be given before an individual undergoes orchiectomy or before inguinal exploration with possibility of orchiectomy. This is an elective surgery which can be done at the time of orchiectomy. Testicular prosthesic placement has known psychological benefits (see below). Although risks for complications with prosthesis is low, individuals should also be informed of the possibility of infection, rotation, and replacement of prosthesis.

== Post-operative care ==
Following orchiectomy, those who have undergone the procedure are advised to avoid bathing, swimming, and heavy lifting for at least one month. If an individual had previously been taking hormone and/or hormone-blocking medications, modifications to their medication would be needed after the procedure. Any androgen-blocking medications, such as spironolactone or cyproterone, are stopped, and estrogen hormones can be resumed at the doctor's discretion. Post-operative pain management includes icing the surgical site, wearing supportive underwear, and the use of pain relief medications (analgesics) such as acetaminophen or ibuprofen; for more severe pain, narcotic analgesics may be needed. A follow-up appointment to monitor recovery and healing is routine.

== Risks and complications ==
Risks and complications should be discussed with an individual pre-operatively. Risks and complications for inguinal orchiectomy include scrotal hematoma (accumulation of blood in the scrotum), infection, post-operative pain (60% initially, 1.8% one year after), phantom testis syndrome (pain in the kidney as a result from trauma from the testicle), reduced fertility, and with the more rare complications being inguinal hernia, ilioinguinal nerve injury, tumor spillage, and hypogonadism.

== Effects ==
Unilateral orchiectomy results in decreased sperm count but does not reduce testosterone levels. Bilateral orchiectomy causes infertility and greatly reduced testosterone levels. In cisgender men, this can lead to side effects including loss of sexual interest, erectile dysfunction, hot flashes, breast enlargement (gynecomastia), weight gain, loss of muscle mass, and osteoporosis. It has been discovered that some individuals with a history of prostate cancer who had bilateral orchiectomy had effects on their new bone production, resulting in increased risk of bone fractures due to testosterone deficiency after the procedure.

Bilateral orchiectomy also reduces the use of exogenous medications for transgender women; the reduction in testosterone eliminates the need for testosterone-blocking medications and can contribute to feminizing features such as breast enlargement.

=== Psychosocial effects ===
==== In males ====
In cisgender men, the loss of one or both testicles from orchiectomy can have severe implications in identity and self-image surrounding masculinity, such that it can lead to thoughts of hopelessness, inadequacy, and loss. Among male testicular cancer survivors who have lost a testicle, there are feelings of shame and loss, which are more evident in young and single men than older and non-single men. As many as one third of men who will undergo orchiectomy are not offered the option of having a testicular prosthesis. Data shows that simply offering testicular prosthesis to men undergoing orchioectomy is psychologically beneficial. While some men do not mind losing a testicle, studies have shown that there is a change in body image in testicular cancer survivors who have undergone orchiectomy and an improvement in body image in 50–60% of individuals who undergo testicular prosthesis placement. One year after testicular prosthesis placement, there are reports of increase in self-esteem and psychological well-being during sexual activity in a study that followed up on post-orchiectomy individuals including adolescents. On the other hand, there is a current debate whether children undergoing orchiectomy should be offered testicular prosthesis to be inserted at the time of orchiectomy procedure.

==== In transfeminine people ====
In transgender women and nonbinary transfeminine people, orchiectomy has many benefits for psychological health. One study found a reduction of gender dysphoria and an increase of daily comfort in 95% of patients, with all subjects being satisfied with the procedure. Another study found similar improvements in dysphoria, body image, and overall wellbeing, with reduction of daily anxiety and depression in 80% of patients. However, most improvements were significantly lower than in patients who received a full vaginoplasty.

In addition to improvements in dysphoria and general wellbeing, many patients take comfort in the permanency of an orchiectomy's effects. The procedure eases worries of remasculinization if hormone therapy is ever stopped, as well as the possibility of getting another person pregnant.

== Medical uses ==
=== Orchiectomy as a gender-affirming procedure ===
Bilateral simple orchiectomy is a gender-affirming surgery for transgender women and other transfeminine individuals. It may be performed as a standalone procedure or at the same time as a vaginoplasty. Bilateral orchiectomy is often performed prior to patients undergoing vaginoplasty. Vaginoplasty can still be administered after undergoing bilateral orchiectomy, as the orchiectomy preserves the penoscrotal skin that can later be transformed into a skin flap. The procedure is also an option for those who are unable to undergo vaginoplasty due to the risk of complications.

In addition to alleviating gender dysphoria, orchiectomy allows trans women to stop taking testosterone-blocking medications (e.g. spironolactone and cyproterone), which may cause unwanted side effects or be contraindicated in some individuals. Common side effects caused by spironolactone include drowsiness, confusion, headache, fatigue, nausea/vomiting, gastritis, polyuria, polydipsia, and electrolyte imbalance (hyperkalemia). Cyproterone can cause side effects such as fatigue, low mood, and fulminant hepatitis.

==== Pre-operative evaluation ====
===== World Professional Association for Transgender Health (WPATH) criteria =====
Criteria from the World Professional Association for Transgender Health (WPATH) are used as a framework to guide health care professionals in approving or denying an orchiectomy. When a transgender individual wants to complete an orchiectomy, they are in a state of gender incongruence and they must meet the criteria before having the procedure done. The criteria are as follows:

(i) persistent, documented gender dysphoria,

(ii) capacity to make informed decisions and consent to treatment,

(iii) well-controlled medical or mental health comorbidities, and

(iv) the use of hormone therapy for 12 months.

Additionally, persons wishing to go through with the procedure are required to obtain referrals from two independent qualified mental health professionals. This referral should include "the individual's demographic information, psychosocial assessment results, duration of the therapeutic relationship, type of evaluation and therapy performed, if the criteria for surgery have been met and if informed consent has been obtained from the patient."

==== Other medical considerations ====
An individual seeking to undergo orchiectomy is evaluated by a healthcare provider to ensure that the procedure is safe. Many candidates for orchiectomy are taking oral estradiol before the operation, which increases risk of intraoperative venous thromboembolism (VTE); thus, the provider must take this risk into account and determine whether prophylaxis (prevention) is necessary. Current smokers, individuals with limited mobility, individuals older than the age of 40, and individuals who have a medical history of thrombolytic disorder are at higher risk of developing VTE. For these high-risk populations, the use of sequential compression devices during the operation is recommended to prevent VTE complications.

=== Orchiectomy as diagnosis and treatment for testicular cancer ===
Testicular cancer most commonly occurs in males ages 15 to 34. In 2017, there were 8,850 new cases and 410 deaths in the United States.

The American Urological Association (AUA) and European Association of Urology (EAU) 2019 guidelines recommend imaging with testicular ultrasound in any individual suspected of having testicular cancer following a physical examination. The ultrasound aids in differentiating diagnoses so that the individual may avoid the need of the surgical approach of inguinal orchiectomy. Inguinal orchiectomy is the gold standard treatment approach for those with confirmed malignancy of testicular cancer. Thus, it is imperative to diagnose the individual as having benign tumor vs. malignant tumor. Benign tumors are cancerous masses typically outside the testicle or surrounding it (extratesticular), whereas the malignant tumors typically lie within/inside the testicle (intratesticular).

An orchiectomy is used not only as a treatment option, but also as a diagnostic tool for testicular cancer. Before an orchiectomy is deemed necessary, liver function tests, tumor markers, and various blood panels are taken to confirm the presence of testicular cancer. Tumor markers that may be checked include beta human chorionic gonadotropin, lactate dehydrogenase, and alpha fetoprotein. These markers are rechecked after orchiectomy to stage the testicular cancer. Imaging, including chest radiography and an abdominal/pelvic CT (computed tomography) are also performed after orchiectomy to evaluate for metastasis. An inguinal orchiectomy is the primary treatment for any cancerous tumor that is found in the testicles; however, in cases where tumors are small, testis- or testes-sparing surgery may be performed instead.

Partial orchiectomy, also known as testis-sparing surgery, is another treatment option for smaller testicular masses which is becoming widely popular in recent years. This treatment option is an alternative to remove testicular cancer masses which are <20 mm, have a high probability of being benign, and with negative serum tumor markers. Its benefits include preserving fertility and normal hormone function.

About half of testicular cancer germ cell tumors are seminomas. Individuals with seminomas are 80-85% likely to have a stage 1 diagnosis and the individual must undergo surveillance every 3–6 months in the first year following their orchiectomy, with an abdominal/pelvic CT at 3, 6 and 12 months. Additional treatment such as chemotherapy may be given if they have risk factors for a relapse. Men with stage 1 seminoma after orchiectomy have been shown to be free from a relapse for five years following orchiectomy.

=== Orchiectomy as a complication of testicular torsion ===
Among children and adolescents diagnosed with testicular torsion, the orchiectomy rate is as high as 42%. Though the goal during surgery is to correct the twist of the spermatic cord, orchiectomy is performed if the testicle is examined during the surgery to have dead tissue (necrosis) and suspected to no longer be a functioning testicle (no fertility). Delays in diagnosis and treatment increase the risk of orchiectomy, with diagnosis in the first four to eight hours of symptoms being critical to prevent permanent ischemic damage, decreased fertility, and need for orchiectomy.

=== Orchiectomy for prostate cancer ===
Prostate cancer, if non-metastatic, is commonly treated with radical prostatectomy or radiation therapy. Less often, orchiectomy is used to treat prostate cancer. Prostate cancer grows in the presence of testosterone. When testosterone is present, " it is metabolized and converted into dihydrotestosterone (DHT) which stimulates the growth of prostate cells. This leads to normal prostate growth in adolescents but contributes to abnormal cell growth in older men." Reducing the amount of testosterone in a person is one way in which prostate cancer is treated. If the prostate cancer is in fact metastatic, then orchiectomy may be used "...to abolish the stimulation of cancer cells by inhibiting testicular testosterone production and thereby reducing androgen levels in the blood: so-called androgen deprivation therapy (ADT)." Castration or orchiectomy is a suitable option for androgen deprivation therapy, and it should be used if a very quick reduction in testosterone levels is needed. However, in recent years, orchiectomy is not commonly used since medical castration is a viable option. Medical castration means that drugs or medications are used to suppress the production of androgens such as testosterone. Some examples of medications used in medical castration include, euprolide, goserelin (Zoladex), buserelin, and triptorelin (Trelstar). Some of the side effects of these medications include but are not limited to "Reduced sexual desire and libido, Impotence, reduced size of testes and penis, hot flashes, growth of breast tissue (gynaecomastia) and pain across the breasts, thinning of the bones or osteoporosis and risk of fracture, anemia, loss of muscle mass, weight gain, fatigue and memory problems, and depression."

=== Orchiectomy for pediatric testis tumors ===
Until the mid-1980s, pediatric testis tumors were managed in accordance with adult guidelines where the standard therapy was radical inguinal orchiectomy. It was later discovered that this procedure was being overused in the pediatric population, particularly those in pre-puberty, because it was assumed that the tumor was malignant. It was discovered that the majority of the pediatric tumor registries over reported malignant tumors and had biased reporting. It has now been found that most tumors are benign lesions and the majority are cases of teratoma which act benign in pre-puberty pediatric individuals along with other benign tumors that have been reported such as: Sertolic cell tumor, Leydig cell tumor and juvenile granulosa cell tumors. Most malignant tumors found in pre-pubertal individuals are pure yolk sac tumors. There is a difference in pre-pubertal, post-pubertal, and adult testis tumors in their histology and their level of malignancy with malignant tumors being rare in the pre-pubertal pediatric population. There has been a consideration to switch to testes sparing surgery (TSS) such as partial orchiectomy specifically for the pre-puberty pediatric populations who lack signs of malignant tumors. Partial orchiectomy allows the ability to preserve hormone function and the possibility of reproduction in the future. It has also been found to increase the quality of life. In the case that an individual is pediatric (<18 years of age) and is a post-pubertal with a malignant testes tumor, they must follow the adult recommended standard guidelines and proceed with radical inguinal orchiectomy.

==== Post-pubertal populations ====
The post-pubertal pediatric population and adults are at higher risk of malignant tumors and usually have a histology of a mixed germ cell tumor. Their first line of treatment is radical orchiectomy; however, they may be candidates for testis-sparing surgery such as partial orchiectomy, if there is a presence of a benign tumor. Although partial orchiectomy is controversial for this group of individuals, it has been found to be a successful procedure for benign masses such as stromal tumors, epidermoid cysts, and fibrous pseudotumors. There is greater use of partial orchiectomy with individuals who have small, benign testicular mass usually < 2 cm which indicate the tumors being benign. There is limited data on the size of tumors of the pediatric population, therefore, size cannot be used as a predictor of a tumor being benign.

== See also ==
- List of surgeries by type
- Index of oncology articles
- Testicular cancer
- Androgen replacement therapy
- Androgen deprivation therapy
- Vasectomy
- Oophorectomy
- Gender reassignment therapy
- Castration
