= Testicular torsion =

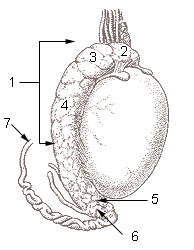
- 1. Epididymis 2. Head of epididymis 3. Lobules of epididymis 4. Body of epididymis 5. Tail of epididymis 6. Duct of epididymis 7. Deferent duct (ductus deferens or vas deferens)
- Specialty: Urology, emergency medicine
- Symptoms: Severe testicular pain, elevated testicle
- Complications: Infertility
- Usual onset: Sudden
- Types: Intravaginal torsion, extravaginal torsion
- Risk factors: "Bell clapper deformity", testicular tumor, cold temperature
- Diagnostic method: Based on symptoms
- Differential diagnosis: Epididymitis, inguinal hernia, torsion of the appendix testicle
- Treatment: Physically untwisting the testicle, surgery
- Prognosis: Generally good with rapid treatment
- Frequency: ~1 in 15,000 per year (under 25 years old)

Testicular torsion occurs when the spermatic cord (from which the testicle is suspended) twists, cutting off the blood supply to the testicle. The most common symptom in children is sudden, severe testicular pain. The testicle may be higher than usual in the scrotum, and vomiting may occur. In newborns, pain is often absent; instead, the scrotum may become discolored or the testicle may disappear from its usual place.

Most of those affected have no obvious prior underlying health problems. Testicular tumor or prior trauma may increase risk. Other risk factors include a congenital malformation known as a "bell-clapper deformity" wherein the testis is inadequately attached to the scrotum allowing it to move more freely and thus potentially twist. Cold temperatures may also be a risk factor. The diagnosis should usually be made based on the presenting symptoms but requires timely diagnosis and treatment to avoid testicular loss. An ultrasound can be useful when the diagnosis is unclear.

Treatment is by physically untwisting the testicle, if possible, followed by surgery. Pain can be treated with opioids. Outcome depends on time to correction. If successfully treated within six hours of onset, it is often good. However, if delayed for 12 or more hours the testicle typically is not salvageable. About 40% of people require removal of the testicle.

It is most common just after birth and during puberty. It occurs in about 1 in 4,000 to 1 in 25,000 males under 25 years of age each year. Of children with testicular pain of rapid onset, testicular torsion is the cause of about 10% of cases. Complications may include infertility. The condition was first described in 1840 by Louis Delasiauve.

== Signs and symptoms ==
Testicular torsion usually presents with severe testicular pain or pain in the groin and lower abdomen. Pain generally begins suddenly and typically involves only one side. There is often associated nausea and vomiting. The testicle may lie higher in the scrotum due to twisting and subsequent shortening of the spermatic cord or may be positioned in a horizontal orientation. Mild warmth and redness of the overlying area may be present. Elevation of the testicle may worsen the pain. Urinary symptoms, such as pain or increased frequency of urination are also typically absent. Symptom onset often follows physical activity or trauma to the testes or scrotum. Children with testicular torsion may awaken with testicular or abdominal pain during midnight or in the morning. There may be a history of previous, similar episodes of scrotal pain due to prior transient testicular torsion with spontaneous resolution.

=== Complications ===
Testicular torsion has many complications. Such include, but are not limited to:

- Testicular infarction: Testicular damage occurs as a consequence of decreased blood flow, and therefore decreased oxygen and nutrient supply, to the testicle. If the testicle is not viable during surgical exploration, it must be removed to prevent further necrosis, or tissue death.
- Infertility: The impact of testicular torsion on long-term fertility is not yet fully understood. However, testicular torsion may cause abnormal sperm function on semen analysis, although these abnormalities are more likely to be found in adolescents and adults. Torsion does not seem to affect long-term sperm function in neonates. The cause of abnormal sperm function is thought to be due to the following mechanisms:
  - Immunological theory, also known as "sympathetic orchidopathia": It is thought that following injury to the testicle, the body's immune system is activated to clean up damaged cells. In the process, it creates anti-testicular cell antibodies, or proteins that cross the injured blood-testis barrier and damage both the affected and contralateral testicles.
  - Abnormalities in microcirculation within the testicle
  - Reperfusion injury: This type of injury is seen in tissues that have been deprived of blood supply for a prolonged period.
- Gangrene, or a type of tissue damage caused by lack of blood supply, of the testis.
- Sepsis, in extremely rare cases (0.03%), if not treated for a long period, it could lead to sepsis and severe life-threatening infections and injuries through the blood and organs, which could lead to death.
- Recurrence of torsion may occur even after surgical fixation, although this is very unlikely.
- Psychological impact of losing a testicle.

== Risk factors ==
Most of those affected with testicular torsion have no prior underlying health problems or predisposing conditions. However, there are certain factors that may increase the risk of testicular torsion. A larger testicle either due to normal variation or testicular tumor increases the risk of torsion. Similarly, the presence of a mass or malignancy involving the spermatic cord can also predispose to torsion.

Age is also an important risk factor for torsion. Torsion most commonly occurs either in the newborn or just before or during puberty. Testicular torsion often occurs before or during puberty, before complete testicular descent. Epididymitis is more commonly a postpubertal condition.

Several congenital anatomic malformations or variations in the testicle or the surrounding structures may allow for increased scrotal rotation and increase the risk of testicular torsion. A congenital malformation of the processus vaginalis known as "bell-clapper deformity" accounts for 90% of all cases. In this condition, rather than the testes attaching posteriorly to the inner lining of the scrotum by the mesorchium, the mesorchium terminates early and the testis is free floating in the tunica vaginalis. Other anatomic risk factors include a horizontal lie of the testicle or a spermatic cord with a long intrascrotal portion. Cryptorchidisim is also a risk factor for torsion with some studies proposing a 10-fold higher risk. Testicular torsion also may be caused by trauma to the scrotum, or exercise (in particular, bicycle riding); however, only about 4–8% of cases are the result of trauma. There is thought to be a possible genetic basis for predisposition to torsion, based on multiple published reports of familial testicular torsion. There is controversy about whether cold weather months are associated with an increased risk.

== Pathophysiology ==
Testicular torsion occurs when there is a mechanical twisting of the spermatic cord, which suspends the testicle within the scrotum and contains the testicular artery and vein. Twisting of the cord reduces or eliminates blood flow to the testicle. The degree of arterial and venous obstruction depends on the duration and severity of the torsion event. Typically, venous blood flow is compromised first. The increase in venous pressure subsequently causes decreased arterial blood flow, leading to decreased oxygen supply to the testicle, and if untreated, testicular infarction.

It is also believed that torsion occurring during fetal development can lead to so-called neonatal torsion or vanishing testis, and is one of the causes of an infant being born with monorchism (one testicle).

=== Intermittent testicular torsion ===
Intermittent testicular torsion (ITT) is a less serious but chronic variant of torsion. It is characterized by intermittent scrotal or testicular pain, followed by eventual spontaneous detorsion and resolution of pain. Nausea and vomiting may also occur. Though less pressing, such individuals are at significant risk of complete torsion and possible subsequent orchiectomy and the recommended treatment is elective bilateral orchiopexy. Ninety-seven percent of patients who undergo such surgery experience complete relief from their symptoms.

=== Extravagina testicular torsion ===
Torsion occurring outside of the tunica vaginalis, when the testis and gubernaculum can rotate freely, is termed an extravaginal testicular torsion. This type occurs exclusively in newborns, however, newborns can be affected by other testicular torsion variants as well. Neonates experiencing such a torsion typically present with painless scrotal swelling, discoloration, and a firm, painless mass in the scrotum. Such testes are usually necrotic from birth and must be removed surgically. The exact cause of or specific risk factors for extravaginal torsion in this population remains unclear.

=== Intravaginal testicular torsion ===
Intravaginal testicular torsion occurs when the testicle rotates on the spermatic cord within the tunica vaginalis. This variant occurs more commonly in older children and adults. The "bell-clapper deformity," in which there is inappropriately high attachment of the tunica vaginalis over the spermatic cord and failure of the normal posterior attachment of the testicle to the inner scrotum, allows the testicle to move freely within the tunica vaginalis and predisposes to intravaginal testicular torsion.

=== Torsion of the testicular appendix ===
The testicular appendix is located in the upper pole of the testicle. It is an embryonic remnant that has no known function but is at risk for torsion events. This type of torsion is the most common cause of acute scrotal pain in boys ages 7–14. Its appearance is similar to that of testicular torsion, but the onset of pain is typically more gradual. Palpation reveals a small firm nodule on the upper portion of the testis, which displays a characteristic "blue dot sign". This is the appendix of the testis, which has become discolored and is noticeably blue through the skin. Unlike other torsions, however, the cremasteric reflex is still active. Typical treatment involves the use of over-the-counter analgesics and the condition resolves within 2–3 days.

=== Torsion of the undescended testicle ===
The undescended testis is at increased risk of testicular torsion. The mechanism for torsion in the undescended testicle is not fully understood, though it may be due to abnormal contractions of the cremaster muscle, which covers the testicle and spermatic cord and is responsible for raising and lowering the testicle to regulate scrotal temperature. The undescended testicle is also at higher risk for testicular tumor, which, due to the increased weight and size compared to a healthy testicle, can predispose to torsion.

== Diagnosis ==
The diagnosis should be made based on the presenting symptoms. An ultrasound can be useful when the diagnosis is unclear. However, imaging should not delay surgical intervention, as complications develop with prolonged ischemia. Immediate surgery is recommended regardless of imaging findings if there is a high degree of suspicion based on history and physical examination.

Quick recognition of worrisome symptoms is essential to preventing delayed presentation and subsequently losing a testicle.

Given the treatment implications of testicular torsion, it is important to distinguish testicular torsion from other causes of testicular pain, such as epididymitis, which can present similarly. While both conditions can cause testicular pain, the pain of epididymitis is typically localized to the epididymis at the rear pole of the testicle. Epididymitis also may be characterized by discoloration and swelling of the testis, and fever. The cremasteric reflex in epididymitis usually is present. Testicular torsion, or more probably impending testicular infarction, also can produce a low-grade fever. There is often an absent or decreased cremasteric reflex.

=== Clinical exam ===
The absence of the cremasteric reflex in an acutely painful testicle is most indicative of testicular torsion (the twisting of the spermatic cord of the testicle makes reflexive responses almost impossible). The cremasteric reflex normally causes elevation of the testicle by stroking the inner thigh. Absence is especially common in children, but its presence does not exclude a diagnosis of testicular torsion.

On physical examination, the testis can be swollen, tender, high-riding, and with an abnormal transverse lie.

Prehn's sign, a classic physical exam finding, has been unreliable in distinguishing torsion from other causes of testicular pain, such as epididymitis. The individual usually will not have a fever, though nausea is common.

=== Imaging ===
A Doppler ultrasound scan of the scrotum can identify the absence of blood flow in the twisted testicle and is nearly 90% accurate in diagnosis. It also can help distinguish torsion from epididymitis.

Radionuclide scanning (scintigraphy) of the scrotum is the most accurate imaging technique, but it is not routinely available, particularly with the urgency that might be required. The agent of choice for this purpose is technetium-99m pertechnetate. Initially it provides a radionuclide angiogram, followed by a static image after the radionuclide has perfused the tissue. In the healthy patient, initial images show symmetric flow to the testes, and delayed images show uniformly symmetric activity. In testicular torsion, the images may show heterogeneous activity within the affected testicle.

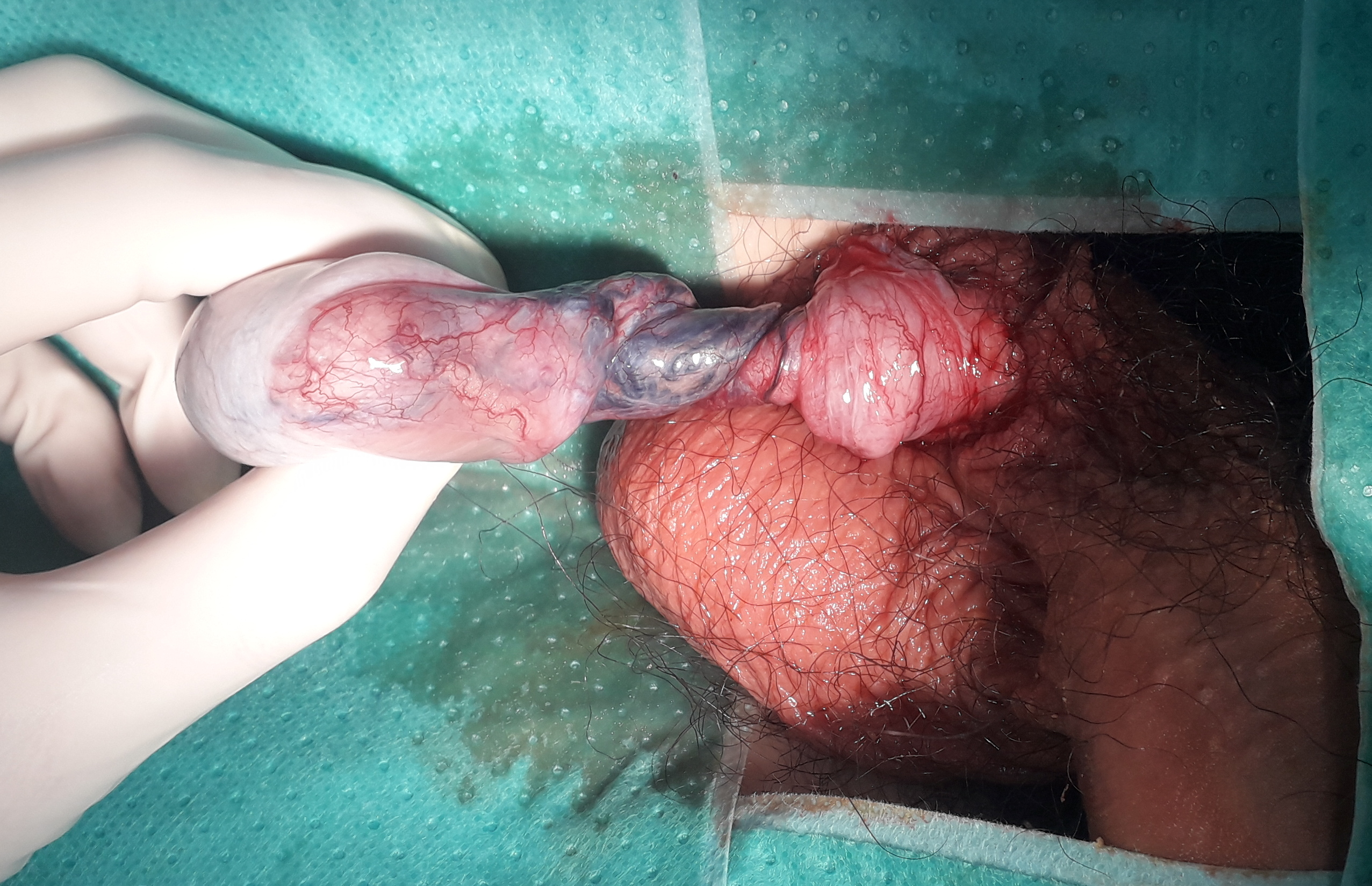
Image of testicular torsion

== Treatment ==
Testicular torsion is a surgical emergency that requires immediate intervention to restore the flow of blood to the testicle. If treated either manually or surgically within six hours, there is a high chance (approximately 90%) of saving the testicle. At 12 hours the rate decreases to 50%; at 24 hours it drops to 10%, and after 24 hours the ability to save the testicle approaches 0, although salvage of the testicle has been reported beyond 24 hours. About 40% of cases result in loss of the testicle.

With prompt diagnosis and treatment, the testicle can often be saved. Typically, when a torsion takes place, the surface of the testicle has rotated towards the midline of the body. Non-surgical correction can sometimes be accomplished by manually rotating the testicle in the opposite direction (i.e., outward, towards the thigh); if this is initially unsuccessful, a forced manual rotation in the other direction may correct the problem.

When salvage of the testicle is accomplished, long-term testicular damage is common. Testicular size is often diminished, and injury to the unaffected testicle is common. The effect of a torsion event on long-term fertility is not fully understood.

A repeat doppler ultrasound scan may confirm restoration of blood flow to the testicle following manual detorsion. However, surgical exploration is often performed in order to assess the health and viability of the testicle and prevent the testicle from experiencing torsion again. An orchiopexy is performed to both the affected and unaffected testicles in order to prevent recurrence. If the testis is not viable, it is removed (orchiectomy).

== Epidemiology ==
Torsion is most frequent among adolescents with about 60% of cases presenting between 10 and 18 years of age. It is the most common cause of rapid onset testicular pain and swelling in males under 18 years old. It occurs in about 1 in 4,000 to 1 per 25,000 males per year before 25 years of age; but it can occur at any age, including infancy.

== See also ==
- Epididymitis – can cause testicular pain and present similarly to testicular torsion.
- Ovarian torsion – an equivalent condition in females.
