= List of Georgetown University faculty =

Selected Georgetown Faculty

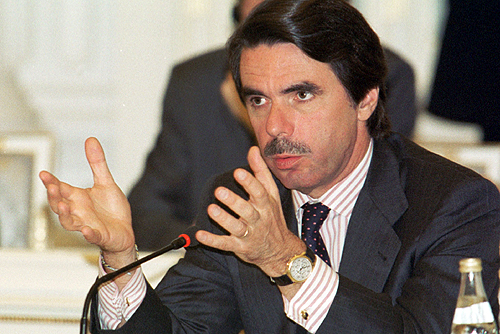
Former prime minister of Spain José María Aznar joined the faculty in 2004.

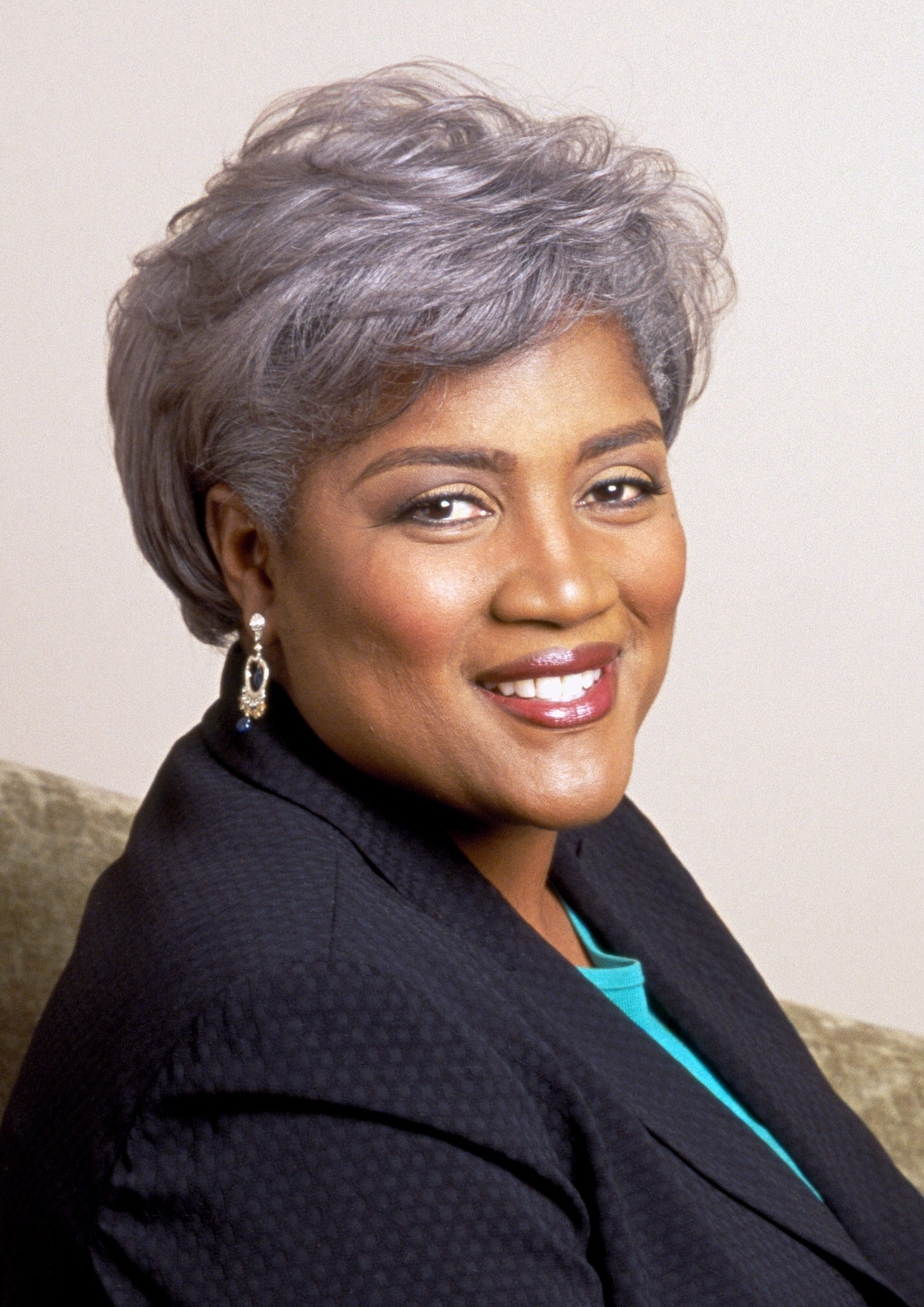
Donna Brazile, professor of women's studies

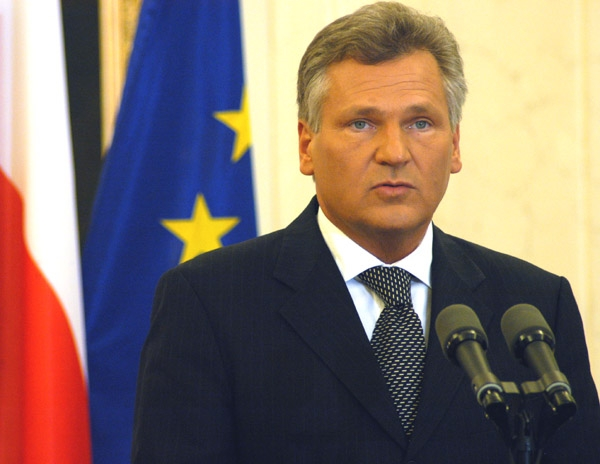
Former president of Poland Aleksander Kwaśniewski joined the faculty in 2006.

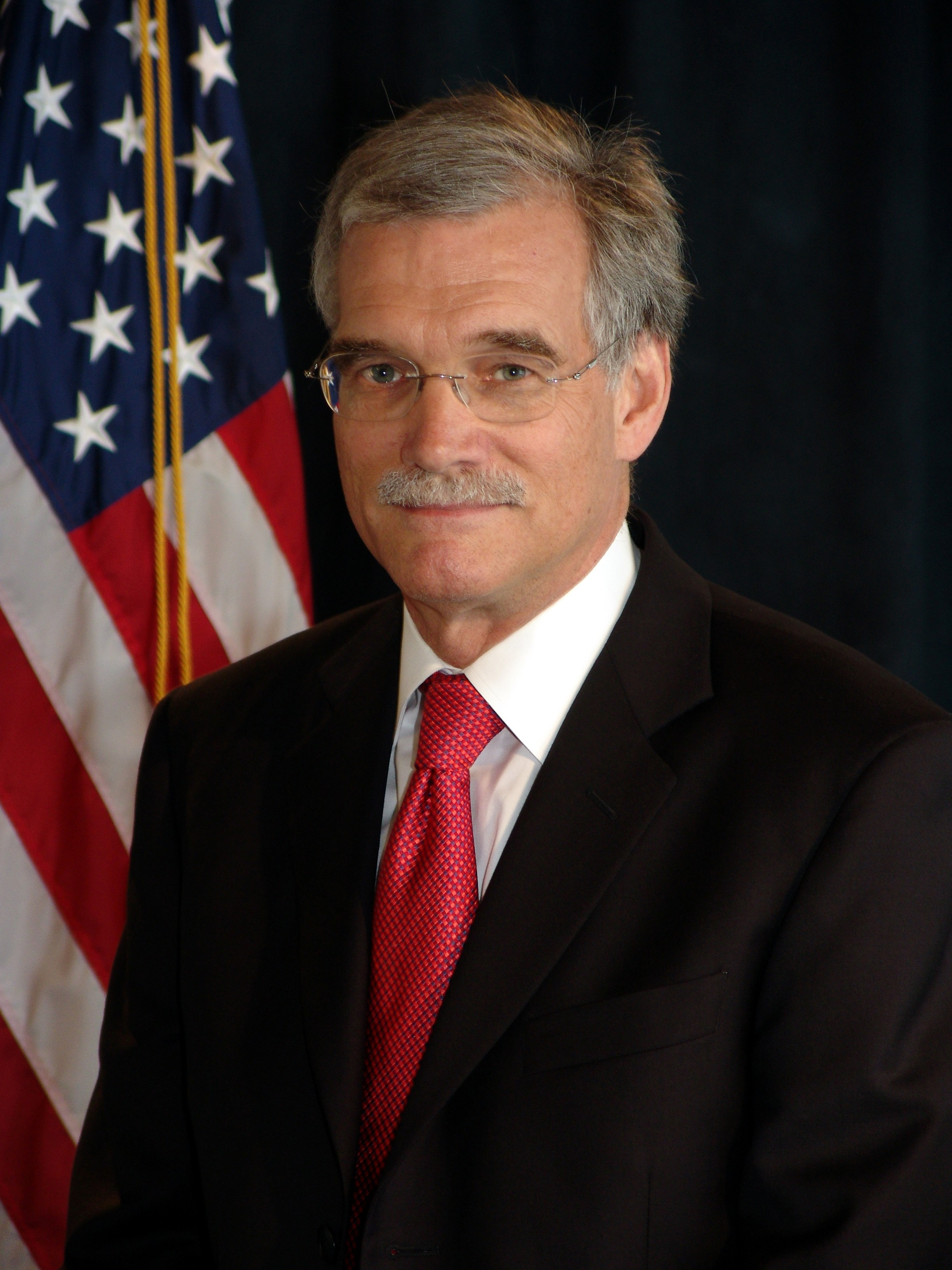
University Provost Robert Groves

Ibrahim Oweiss in his classroom at the Georgetown School of Foreign Service in Qatar

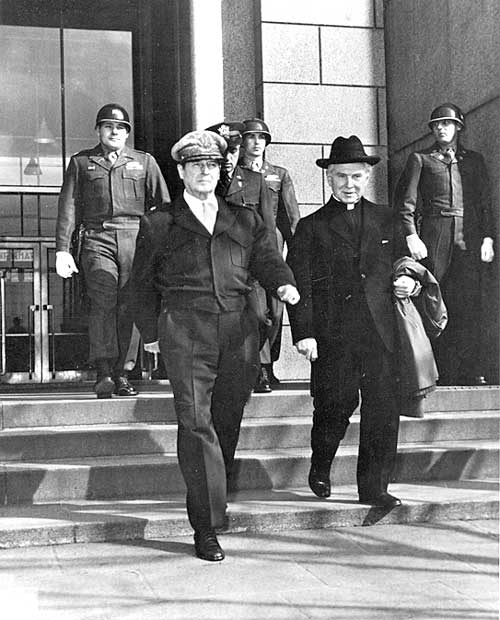
Edmund A. Walsh with General Douglas MacArthur in Tokyo, 1948

This is a list of notable Georgetown University faculty, including both current and past faculty at the Washington, D.C. school. As of 2007, Georgetown University employs approximately 1,202 full-time and 451 part-time faculty members across its three campuses. Many former politicians choose to teach at Georgetown, including U.S. Agency for International Development administrator Andrew Natsios, National Security Advisor Anthony Lake, U.S. senator and Senate Democratic leader Tom Daschle, Under Secretary of Defense for Policy Douglas Feith, and CIA director George Tenet. Politically, Georgetown's faculty members give more support to liberal candidates, and their donation patterns are consistent with those of other American university faculties. All of Georgetown University's presidents have been faculty as well.

== Current faculty ==
=== Business ===
- Reena Aggarwal
- Jason Brennan
- Michael Czinkota
- Pietra Rivoli

=== Economics ===
- George Akerlof
- Ibrahim Oweiss

=== English ===
- Ly Xīnzhèn M. Zhǎngsūn Brown
- Maureen Corrigan
- Jennifer Natalya Fink
- Carolyn Forché
- Aminatta Forna
- David Gewanter
- Christopher Shinn

=== Government ===
- José María Aznar
- Paul Begala
- E. J. Dionne
- Pablo Eisenberg (1999– )
- Ted Gayer
- Thane Gustafson
- Charles King
- Aleksander Kwaśniewski (2006– )
- Mark Lance
- Robert Lieber (1982– )
- Catherine Lotrionte
- Hans Noel
- Sam Potolicchio
- Yossi Shain (1999–2003)
- Kathleen Kennedy Townsend
- Sanford J. Ungar
- Arturo Valenzuela

=== History ===
- Jordan Sand

=== International relations ===
- Madeleine Albright
- Anthony Clark Arend
- Chester Crocker (1972–1981, 1989– )
- Robert Gallucci (1996–2009)
- Chuck Hagel (2009– )
- H. Allen Holmes
- Seth Jones
- Christopher C. Joyner
- Matthew Kroenig
- Anthony Lake
- Robert Litwak
- Donald McHenry
- Dale D. Murphy
- David Nalle
- Paul R. Pillar
- George Tenet (2004– )
- Álvaro Uribe

=== Languages ===
- Charles Lane
- James J. O'Donnell
- Deborah Tannen

=== Law ===
- Charles F. Abernathy
- T. Alexander Aleinikoff
- Walter Berns
- Norman Birnbaum
- M. Gregg Bloche
- Rosa Brooks
- Paul Clement
- David D. Cole
- Viet D. Dinh
- Peter Edelman
- Sheila Foster
- Lawrence O. Gostin
- Pamela Harris
- Judith Richards Hope
- Robert Katzmann
- Richard J. Leon (1997– )
- David J. McCarthy, Jr. (1965– )
- Naomi Mezey
- Jeffrey P. Minear
- Robert Pitofsky
- John Podesta
- Nicholas Quinn Rosenkranz
- Mark Tushnet
- David Vladeck
- Edith Brown Weiss

=== Medicine ===
- Ron Waksman

=== Philosophy ===
- Alfonso Gomez-Lobo
- Horace Romano Harré
- Jesse Mann
- Hans-Martin Sass
- Nancy Sherman

=== Science ===
- Rachel Barr
- Edward M. Barrows
- Daniel Djakiew
- Dietrich Grönemeyer
- Cal Newport
- Karl H. Pribram
- Richard Schlegel

=== Sociology ===
- Donna Brazile
- Victor Cha
- Michael Eric Dyson (2007– )
- Colman McCarthy
- Maxine Weinstein

=== Theology ===
- Jacques Berlinerblau
- John Esposito
- Chester Gillis
- John Haught

== Previous faculty ==
- Royden B. Davis (1966–1989)
- Benedict Joseph Flaget (1795–1798)
- Patrick Francis Healy (1866–1882)
- Ambrose Maréchal (c. 1801)

=== Art ===
- José Antonio Bowen
- Paul Hume (1950–1977)
- Joel E. Siegel

=== Business ===
- Thomas Donaldson (1990–1996)
- George R. Houston, Jr.
- Robert Pozen
- Annette Shelby

=== Economics ===
- Selma Mushkin
- Tarik Yousef

=== Language ===
- Thomas V. Bermingham (c. 1950s)
- Roland Flint (1968–1997)
- Dmitry Grigorieff (1959–1989)
- Robert Lado (1960–1980)
- Mario Vargas Llosa (1994)
- Scott Pilarz (1996–2003)
- Michael Scott (1975–1989)
- Peter Steinfels (1997–2001)

=== Law ===
- Henry Sherman Boutell (1914–1923)
- James R. Browning
- James Harry Covington (1914–1919)
- Samuel Dash (1965–2004)
- John F. Davis (c. 1970s)
- Robert Drinan (1981–2007)
- Martin D. Ginsburg
- Stephen Haseler
- Stephanie Herseth Sandlin
- Neal Katyal
- Mari Matsuda (–2008)
- Maeve Kennedy McKean
- Bruce Ohr (1984)
- John G. Roberts (c. 1992)
- Antonin Scalia (c. 1982)
- Joseph E. Schmitz (c. 1990s)
- Carlton R. Sickles (1960–1966)
- John Wolff (1961–2005)

=== Government ===
- As'ad AbuKhalil
- Kenneth Baer
- Hanna Batatu (1982–1994)
- William J. Brennan, Jr. (1990–1994)
- Anthony Cordesman
- Tom Daschle (c. 2005)
- Douglas J. Feith (2006–2008)
- Geraldine Ferraro (c. 2000s)
- Anwar Ibrahim (2004–2006)
- Jan Karski (1952–1992)
- Jeane Kirkpatrick (1967–1980, 1985)
- Claes G. Ryn
- James V. Schall (1977–2012)
- Joseph P. Vigorito (1977–1978)

=== History ===
- Walter Laqueur (1976–1988)
- Vladimir Petrov
- Frank M. Snowden, Jr.
- Cyril Toumanoff (1943–1970)
- Allen Weinstein (1981–1984)

=== International relations ===
- James R. Clapper (2006–2007)
- Jules Davids
- Eleanor Lansing Dulles
- John Ikenberry (2001–2004)
- Henry Kissinger (1977–1979)
- Dennis P. Lockhart (2003–2007)
- Louis E. McComas (c. 1890s)
- Andrew Natsios (c. 2005)
- Robert G. Neumann (1976-c. 1990)
- Carroll Quigley
- Florence Roisman
- Dennis Ross (2006–2009)
- Paul A. Russo (1991)
- Sally Shelton-Colby (1991)
- Jean Edward Smith
- Edmund A. Walsh

=== Medicine ===
- Malcolm Mencer Martin (1959–2004)

=== Philosophy ===
- Edmund Pellegrino (1978–2013)
- Henry Babcock Veatch (1973–1983)

=== Science ===
- James Curley (1831–1889)
- Edward D. Freis (1957–2005)
- Gregory Jaczko
- Robert S. Ledley
- Paul McNally (1928–1955)
- Charles Wardell Stiles
- William J. Thaler (1960–1976, 1979–2006)

=== Theology ===
- Thomas M. King (1968–2009)
- Richard A. McCormick
- Arthur Peacocke (1994)

== Fictional ==
- In Stargate Atlantis, the main character, Dr. Elizabeth Weir, taught a political science course at Georgetown before going to Atlantis.
- Jason Bourne, the main character in the novels of Robert Ludlum and their subsequent film adaptations, is a linguistics professor at Georgetown in The Bourne Legacy, Eric Van Lustbader's 2004 novel continuing Ludlum's series.
- Henry McCord, the husband of United States Secretary of State Elizabeth McCord, is a religion professor at Georgetown on Madam Secretary.
