= Daniel Djakiew =

Australian academic

- Professor
- Born: 1956
- Occupation(s): Scholar and Scientist

Daniel Djakiew (born 1956 in Newcastle, Australia) is a scholar, researcher, teacher, and tenured full professor in the Department of Biochemistry and Molecular & Cellular Biology, School of Medicine, Georgetown University, Washington DC.

== Research ==
At University of Newcastle (1978–1983), he conducted research on the evolution of the male reproductive tract as revealed by monotreme mammals. These studies showed that periurethral glands in the male monotreme represent a rudimentary disseminate prostate (prostate evolution in monotreme mammals), and that the monotreme epididymis has many similarities to that of reptiles compared with scrotal mammals (epididymis evolution from reptiles to mammals). After moving to Georgetown University (1983–present) he collaborated with Johns Hopkins University to demonstrate the physiological role of enhanced oxygen availability in the sperm storage region of the epididymis at cooler scrotal temperatures as a prime mover in the evolution of descended testes in mammals.

He was an early adopter of tissue culture technology as subsequently applied to dual chamber culture systems (1985–1991) to investigate polarized secretion in Sertoli cells and prostate cells, especially as they were used to examine paracrine factors in cell-to-cell interactions.

Studies of prostate cancer (1990–2010) examined the expression of the neurotrophins and their receptors (Trk family and p75NTR) in epithelial cells. These studies revealed the role of the p75NTR as a tumor suppressor in prostate epithelial cells and that loss of p75NTR mRNA stability in tumor cells contributes to malignant transformation of normal cells to a cancer phenotype. Moreover, treatment of tumor cells with selective non-steroidal anti-inflammatory drugs (NSAIDs) was shown to induce re-expression of p75NTR in tumor cells and induce apoptotic cell death.

Djakiew received the young investigator of the year award from the Society for the Study of Fertility (Walpole Lecturer) at Oxford University in 1991. He also received the Distinguished Research in Reproductive Biology Award, University of Newcastle, Australia in 1991. He then was a recipient of a Research Career Development Award from the National Institutes of Health from 1993 to 1998. Subsequently, he received the Chaire de Professeur Invite, L’University d’Angers, France (1996–1997), and cited (November 2020) to be one of the World's Top 2% Scientists by Stanford University.

Djakiew has publications in 73 journals, five review publications and eight book chapters. He has supervised 7 Ph.D. students.

== Teaching ==
Teaching activities (1985–present) at Georgetown University include course director of cell biology/histology across multiple modules for 1st and 2nd year medical students as well as specific lectures therein. Additionally, lectures are given to post-graduate students in the Medical School at Georgetown University. Djakiew was also course director and lecturer of cell biology/histology held at the Prince William Campus of George Mason University for the GeorgeSquared program (2010–2023), a collaborative course of post-graduate studies between Georgetown University and George Mason University. Furthermore, Professor Djakiew is the course director and teacher of a Deep Dive on The Prostate and its Diseases for medical students at Georgetown University (2025-present).

== Service ==
Djakiew was elected to the university wide faculty senate, and has been appointed to serve on a number of departmental, medical school, and university wide committees.
