= Delta Phi Epsilon (professional) =

American foreign service fraternity

- ΔΦΕ
- Founded: January 25, 1920; 106 years ago Georgetown University
- Type: Professional
- Affiliation: Independent
- Status: Active
- Emphasis: Foreign service
- Scope: National
- Motto: λατρεύω Latreuo "I Serve"
- Colors: Black and Gold
- Flower: Morning glory
- Chapters: 12 active
- Headquarters: 3401 Prospect Street, NW; PO Box 25401; Washington, D.C. 20007; United States
- Website: www.deltaphiepsilon.net

Delta Phi Epsilon (ΔΦΕ) or Delta Phi Epsilon Foreign Service Council the largest national American professional foreign service fraternity and sorority. Founded on January 25, 1920, it was the first fraternity dedicated to careers in foreign diplomacy and trade. Its Alpha chapter went on in the first half of the twentieth century to colonize new chapters at many other universities throughout the country. However, most chapters went defunct in the latter half of the century. In 1973, Delta Phi Epsilon Foreign Service Sorority was founded, with its Alpha chapter at Georgetown University. As of 2021, there remained ten active collegiate chapters, half of which were created between 2016 and 2018.

== History ==
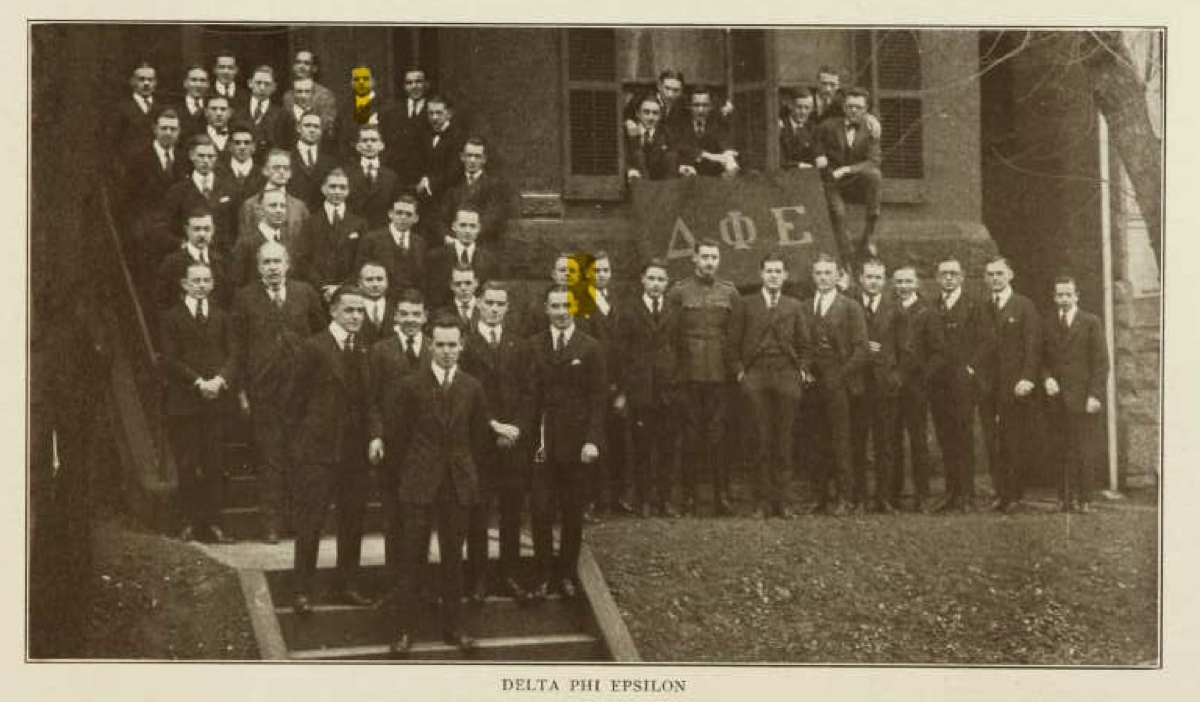
Delta Phi Epsilon's first chapter house on Massachusetts Avenue, NW, in Washington, D.C. in 1921

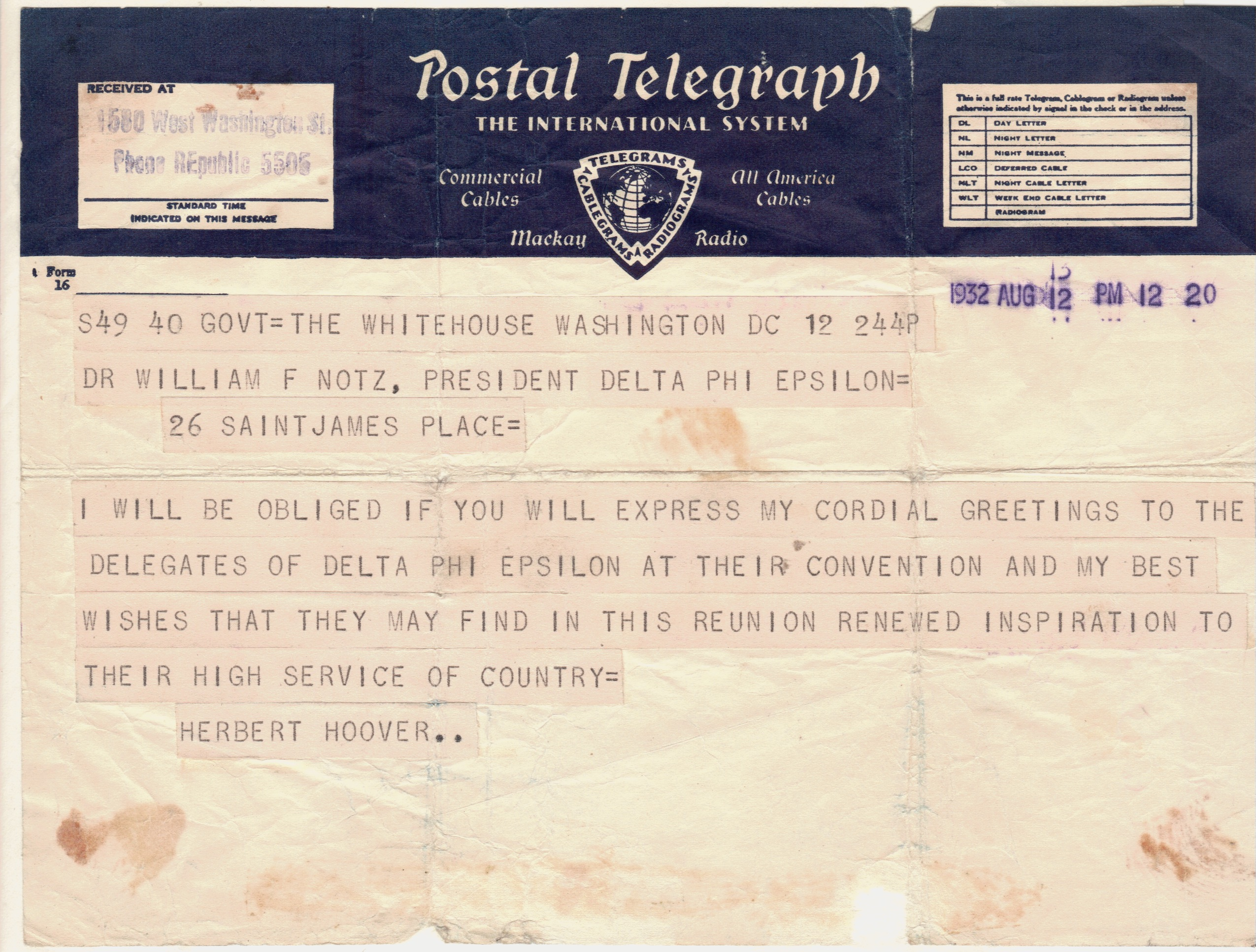
During its National Convention in June 1932, President Herbert Hoover sent a congratulatory telegram.

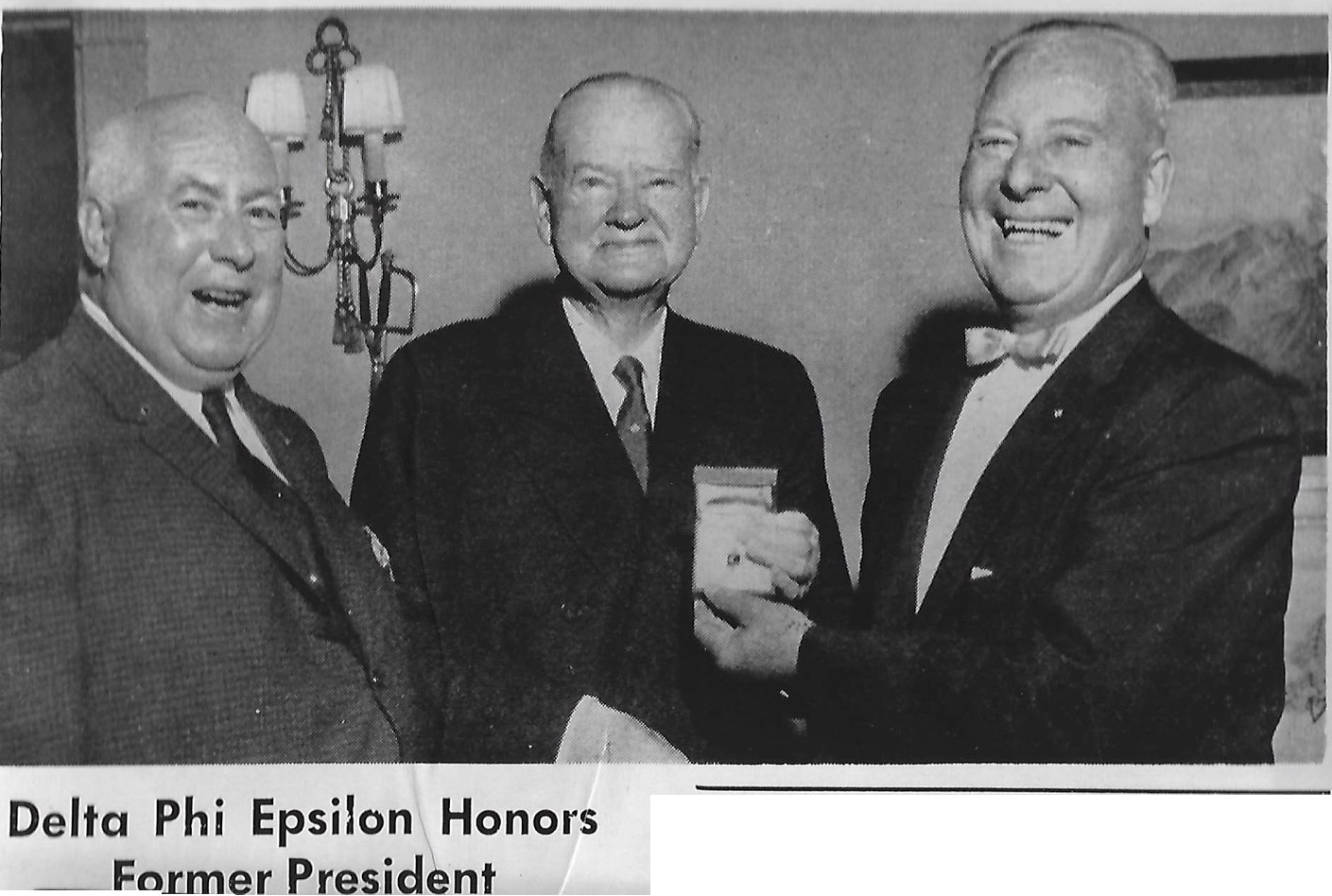
Former U.S. President Herbert. Hoover receives the DPE Honor Key on June 25, 1960, from DPE national president Leonard Sutter and DPE Southern California Alumni Association president Buel Williamson.

=== Fraternity ===
The fraternity was founded in the wake of World War I, at a time of heightened interest in world politics and in solving global issues through diplomacy. In 1919, Fr. Edmund A. Walsh, S.J. at Georgetown University founded the School of Foreign Service (SFS) and in 1924, the Rogers Act formed the basis of the United States Foreign Service. During this time, other groups with similar missions, such as the Council on Foreign Relations, were founded, along with international bodies such as the League of Nations.

The four founders of the fraternity were Alfred O. Arseneau, Wesley O. Ash, Samuel C. Bartlett, and T. J. Patrick O'Connell. At first, three of them, all undergraduates in Georgetown's SFS living together on 10th Street, held in common only their experience in overseas military service and their interest in foreign service careers. Soon, they met the fourth, Pat O'Connell, who thought of founding a foreign service fraternity independently. They were drawn together by their common vision for a professional foreign service fraternity for future graduates of the School of Foreign Service and others in the field.

Later, these men joined with seven other interested undergraduates (future brothers Sandager, Butts, Ash, MacKenzie, Brooks, Sullivan, Scott, and Bates) and signed the Articles of Agreement. After choosing a name and nominating officers, Delta Phi Epsilon Foreign Service Fraternity was formally founded at the Catholic Community House at 6th and E Streets, NW, on January 25, 1920. The group was incorporated in the District of Columbia on April 20, 1920. Early expansion focused on both East and West Coast schools. The fraternity's activities and expansion ceased during World War II.

After the war, the fraternity saw even greater expansion into institutions across the United States. By the 1960s, the fraternity began to see a decline in the number of its chapters. During the 1970s most of the fraternity's collegiate chapters went inactive, leaving only the original Alpha. This decline is attributed to two major factors: a national decline in professional fraternities and a negative perception generally of foreign service. During the Vietnam War, foreign service was closely associated in many minds with current United States foreign policy, which was protested against at many member institutions.

After some attempts during the 1990s, several of these defunct chapters were revived in the 2000s. The Alpha chapter at Georgetown University went defunct but was revived in 1990 after ten years of inactivity and revived again in 1998 after another five years of inactivity. In the summer of 2003, the first reactivation of an inactive chapter, the Epsilon chapter at UC Berkeley, occurred. In 2016, the first co-ed chapter, the Delta chapter, was founded at USC by Jacob Lokshin and eleven other USC students. This was soon followed by the creation of Pi, Psi, Chi, Eta, Gamma, and Mu chapters.

The Alpha chapter was the longest-lived collegiate chapter of Delta Phi Epsilon; its undergraduate officers all resigned in 2018 and suspended all chapter activities in protest of the actions of national leadership. The chapter has three successive one-person initiations over the succeeding eighteen months. In late February 2020, Alpha initiated the chapter's 200th line of ten initiates, just before the fraternity's 100th Founders' Day Banquet.

=== Sorority ===
In the 1950s, some members suggested that the fraternity accept women. Gregory Creutz (Alpha 1921), national general secretary, led the way to a compromise. In 1956 the National Board of Directors of the fraternity created the Delta Phi Epsilon International Society of Business and Foreign Affairs which was to be open to both men and women. However, that society failed to develop,

Another movement to make the fraternity coed emerged in the late 1960s. During the 1972 National Convention, members voted to amend the bylaws to admit female members. However, the amendment ultimately failed because the members did not approve it a second time at either of the next two conventions.

In June 1972, the Alpha chapter at Georgetown changed to include both a fraternity and a sorority of the Delta Phi Epsilon Professional Foreign Service. The two groups operated separately when it came to recruiting and initiating members. However, the two groups worked together for professional and social programs.

The Alpha chapter of the sorority held its first initiation on February 24, 1973. A second chapter of the sorority, the Epsilon chapter, was founded at UC Berkeley in 2003.

In January 2021, the American University chapter withdrew from the national organization, saying that the national board "was unrepresentative of its values." The group continued as the local organization Sisterhood for International Engagement.

=== Co-educational ===
In 2016, the fraternity's National Convention endorsed a proposal for joint fraternity-sorority projects, including publishing a peer-reviewed Delta Phi Epsilon Journal of Foreign Affairs, operating a scholarship competition for students who had been initiated into Delta Phi Epsilon, and holding an annual symposium promoting alumni and student international relations research. This project developed into the Delta Phi Epsilon Foreign Affairs Council, incorporated and recognized as a 501(c)(3) nonprofit educational organization in 2016. The council originally selected its leaders from Delta Phi Epsilon members to support international relations education, promote public engagement in foreign policy, and provide career development tools to Delta Phi Epsilon brothers and sisters.

In 2016, the first co-ed chapter, the Delta chapter, was founded at the University of Southern California by Jacob Lokshin and eleven other USC students. The Gamma chapter also merged the sorority and fraternity into a single co-ed chapter in 2016. However, some of the national fraternity's leadership continue to oppose the admission of women.

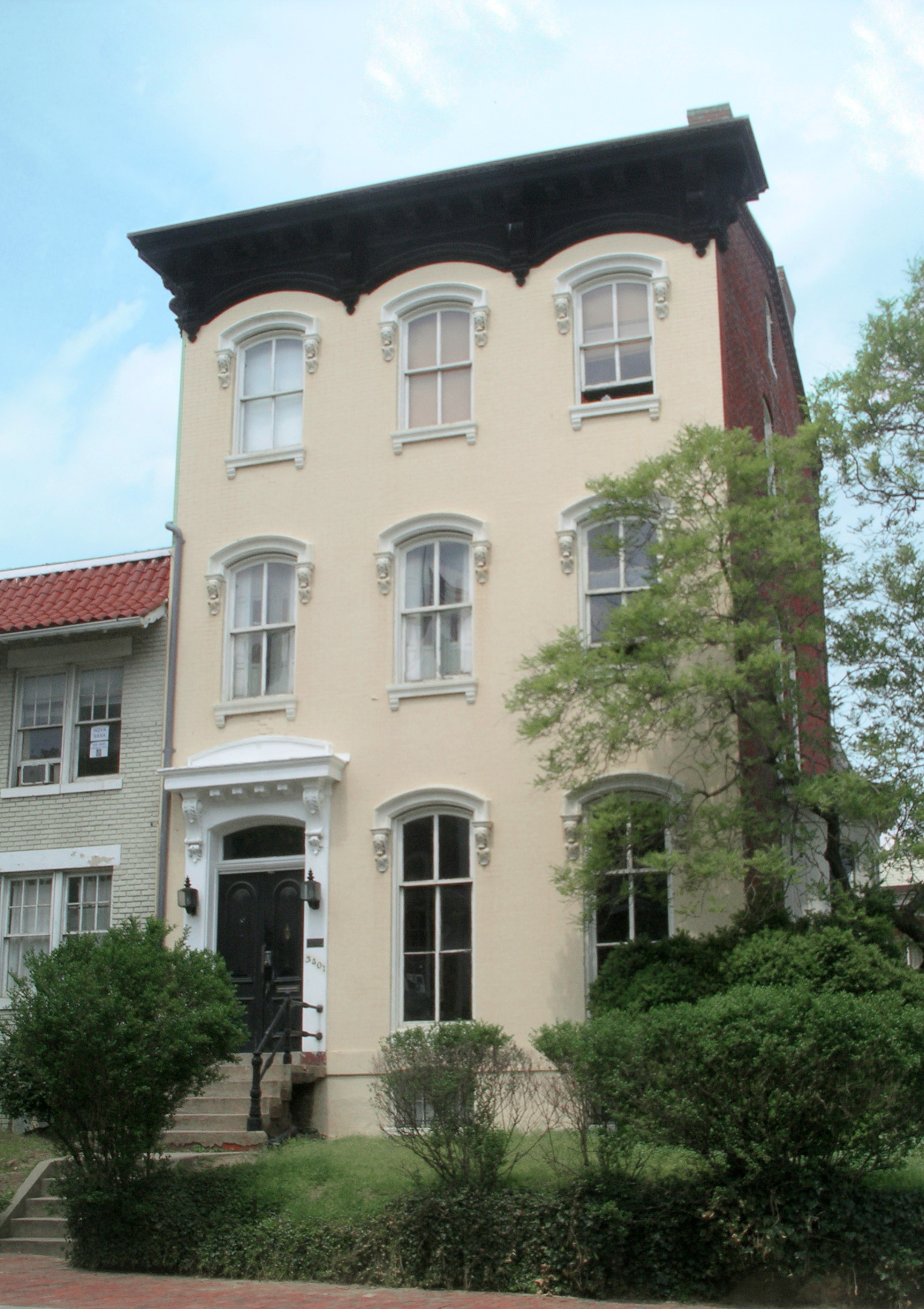
Alpha chapter house in Georgetown

== Symbols ==
Delta Phi Epsilon's motto is λατρεύω or "I Serve". Its colors are black and gold. Its flower is the morning glory.

== Chapter house ==
The fraternity purchased the former Seymour House in Georgetown as a chapter house for $27,500 in 1940. Constructed in 1869 by merchant William E. Seymour, 3401 Prospect Street Northwest was home to the Alpha chapter until 2020. The three-story brick chapter house had fifteen rooms. It is a contributing property to the Georgetown Historic District and became a National Historic Landmark listed on the National Register of Historic Places in 1967. For decades, the Alpha chapter of Delta Phi Epsilon was the only fraternal organization at Georgetown University with its own house. It was used for keg parties and social events.

During the February 2020 annual meeting of Delta Phi Epsilon, its members voted to sell 3401 Prospect Street for as much money as possible. The Alpha chapter's historic house purportedly had to be sold because it was believed that Georgetown University implemented a rule requiring undergraduates to live on campus for four years. A new house might be purchased by the foundation, not the fraternity or the Delta Phi Epsilon corporation. It would be based on a clubhouse model and would be owned by the foundation. It would not be a boarding house and would not be owned by the Delta Phi Epsilon corporation, which had owned 3401 Prospect Street.

== Membership ==
The fraternity initiates Line Brothers, those who pledge when they are students, and National Brothers, mostly those already out of school who only go through the required final initiation ritualistic ceremonies.

== Organizational structure ==
Several distinct and separate corporations use the name Delta Phi Epsilon. Delta Phi Epsilon, Incorporated is a 501(c)(7) nonprofit corporation. This corporation is a member-based nonprofit corporation. Its board is self-appointed, with sitting board members selecting replacements as seats become vacant. The Delta Phi Epsilon Foundation for Foreign Service Education is a 501(c)(3) nonprofit organization established in 1960. Its purpose is to give scholarships to students.

== Chapters ==
In the following list, active chapters are listed in bold and inactive chapters are in italics.

| Chapter | Charter date and range | Institution | Location | Gender | Status | Ref. |
|---|---|---|---|---|---|---|
| **Alpha** (fraternity) | January 25, 1920 – 1980; 1981–198x ?; 1990–1993; 1996 | Walsh School of Foreign Service | Washington, D.C. | Male | Active? | |
| **Alpha** (sorority) | 1973–1981; 1990–1996; 1998 | Walsh School of Foreign Service | Washington, D.C. | Female | Active | |
| Beta | December 30, 1920 – 1966; 2009–2xxx ? | New York University Stern School of Business | New York City, New York | Male | Inactive | |
| **Gamma** | May 22, 1922–1933; 1993–1996; 2016 | Boston University Pardee School of Global Studies | Boston, Massachusetts | Co-ed | Active | (Note: This chapter was male-only when established. Now, the fraternity and sorority operated as a single co-ed entity.) |
| Gamma (sorority) | 1994–199x ? | Boston University | Boston, Massachusetts | Female | Consolidated | (Note: The sorority consolidated with the fraternity to form a co-ed chapter.) |
| **Delta** | March 24, 1923 – 1974; 2016 | USC School of International Relations | Los Angeles, California | Co-ed | Active | (Note: Originally formed from the local Seven Seas Club) (Note: Chartered as a male-only chapter. It became co-ed when it was re-established in 2016.) |
| **Epsilon** | April 1, 1923 – 19xx ?; 1960–1973; 2003 | Haas School of Business | Berkeley, California | Co-ed | Active | (Note: Originally formed from the local Pacific Foreign Tradesmen organization) (Note: This chapter was established as male-only. It became co-ed sometime after 2003.) |
| Epsilon (sorority) | 1999–19xx ?; 2003–20xx ? | Haas School of Business | Berkeley, California | Female | Consolidated | (Note: This chapter merged with the fraternity to create a co-ed chapter.) |
| Zeta | February 3, 1924 – 19xx ? | University of Detroit Mercy | Detroit, Michigan | Male | Inactive | (Note: This chapter was formed from the local organization, the Cosmos Club of the University of Detroit) |
| **Eta** (fraternity) | December 15, 1929 – 1943; 1944–1955; 1964–1969; 2004–20xx ?; 2023 | Elliott School of International Affairs | Washington, D.C. | Co-Ed | Active | (Note: This chapter was created from the local fraternity Delta Phi.) |
| **Eta** (sorority) | 2005 | Elliott School of International Affairs | Washington, D.C. | Female | Inactive | |
| Theta | March 11, 1939 – 197x ? | Northwestern University Kellogg School of Management | Evanston, Illinois | Male | Inactive | |
| Iota Prime | April 29, 1939 – 194x ? | University of Wisconsin–Madison | Madison, Wisconsin | Male | Inactive | (Note: This chapter ceased operations during World War II.) |
| Iota | 1962–197x ? | Wayne State University | Detroit, Michigan | Male | Inactive | |
| Kappa | May 14, 1949 – 197x ? | Leland Stanford Junior University | Palo Alto, California | Male | Inactive | |
| Lambda | May 15, 1949 – 197x ? | Thunderbird School of Global Management | Phoenix, Arizona | Male | Inactive | (Note: This chapter began as the local group American Institute for Foreign Trade, also known as the Foreign Trade Club.) |
| Lambda (sorority) | 197x ?–1994 | Thunderbird School of Global Management | Phoenix, Arizona | Female | Inactive | |
| Mu | November 19, 1955 – 197x ?; 2017–20xx ? | Michigan State University | East Lansing, Michigan | Male | Inactive | |
| **Mu** (sorority) | 2015 | Michigan State University | East Lansing, Michigan | Female | Active | |
| Nu | April 8, 1964 – 197x ? | University of Michigan | Ann Arbor, Michigan | Male | Inactive | |
| Xi | May 25, 1966 – 197x ? | Texas Tech University | Lubbock, Texas | Male | Inactive | |
| Xi (sorority) | 197x ?–1994 | Texas Tech University | Lubbock, Texas | Female | Inactive | |
| Omicron | March 12, 1965 – 197x ?; 1992–xxxx ? | Occidental College | Los Angeles, California | Male | Inactive | |
| Omicron (sorority) | 1989–1993 | Occidental College | Los Angeles, California | Female | Inactive | |
| **Pi** | December 3, 1967 – 197x ?; 2016 | American University School of International Service | Washington, D.C. | Male | Active | |
| Pi (sorority) | 2009–2021 | American University School of International Service | Washington, D.C. | Female | Withdrew | (Note: This chapter disaffiliated from the national organization in 2021, becoming the local group Sisterhood for International Engagement.) |
| Rho | February 19, 1971 – 197x ? | California State University, Los Angeles | Los Angeles, California | Male | Inactive | |
| Rho (sorority) | 19xx ?–199x ? | California State University, Los Angeles | Los Angeles, California | Female | Inactive | |
| Sigma | February 22, 1972 – 197x ? | Pepperdine University | Los Angeles, California | Male | Inactive | |
| Sigma (sorority) | 1972–197x ? | Pepperdine University | Los Angeles, California | Female | Inactive | |
| Tau | April 5, 1974 – 197x ? | Loyola Marymount University | Los Angeles, California | Male | Inactive | |
| Tau (sorority) | 1974–197x ? | Loyola Marymount University | Los Angeles, California | Female | Inactive | |
| Upsilon | February 29, 1976 – 197x ? | Arizona State University | Tempe, Arizona | Male | Inactive | |
| Upsilon (sorority) | 1976–197x ? | Arizona State University | Tempe, Arizona | Female | Inactive | |
| Phi | April 25, 1975 – 197x ? | University of South Carolina | Columbia, South Carolina | Male | Inactive | |
| Phi (sorority) | 1975–197x ? | University of South Carolina | Columbia, South Carolina | Female | Inactive | |
| **Chi** | February 19, 2016 | James Madison University | Harrisonburg, Virginia | Co-ed | Active | |
| **Psi** | November 16, 2008 – 20xx ?; 2017 | University of the Pacific | Stockton, California | Male | Active | |
| **Psi** (sorority) | 2008 | University of the Pacific | Stockton, California | Female | Active | |
| Omega | February 20, 1976 – 197x ? | Southern Methodist University | Dallas, Texas | Male | Inactive | |
| Omega (sorority) | 1976–197x ? | Southern Methodist University | Dallas, Texas | Female | Inactive | |
| Beta Alpha | 1962–197x ? | Wayne State University | Detroit, Michigan | Male | Inactive | |

== Notable members ==
Following are some of the notable members of Delta Phi Epsilon.

| Name | Chapter | Year | Type | Notability | Ref. |
|---|---|---|---|---|---|
| Diego C. Asencio | Alpha | 1950 | Line | U.S. Ambassador to Colombia, U.S. Ambassador to Brazil | |
| Robert Barr | Delta | 1970 | Line | United States House of Representatives | |
| Derek C. Bok | Kappa | 1950 | Line | President of Harvard University and dean of Harvard Law School | |
| St. Clair Bourne | Alpha | 1962 | Line | Documentary filmmaker | |
| Charles A. Coulombe | Alpha | 2004 | National | Historian, author, journalist, and lecturer | |
| William S. Culbertson | Alpha | 1920 | National | U.S. Ambassador to Romania, U.S. Ambassador to Chile | |
| Roderic H. Davison | Eta | 1948 | National | Professor of government at George Washington University | |
| Walt Disney | Delta | 1950 | National | Film director, producer, screenwriter, voice actor, and animator | |
| James F. Dobbins | Alpha | 1960 | Line | U.S. Ambassador to the European Union | |
| Lev Dobriansky | Alpha | 1968 | National | U.S. Ambassador to the Bahamas, Georgetown University professor | |
| Thomas J. Dodd Jr. | Alpha | 1972 | National | U.S. Ambassador to Uruguay, U.S. Ambassador to Costa Rica | |
| Walter J. Donnelly | Alpha | 1920 | Line | U.S. Ambassador to Costa Rica, U.S. Ambassador to Venezuela, U.S. Ambassador to Austria | |
| Don C. Faith Jr. | Alpha | 1938 | Line | Officer in the United States Army, Medal of Honor recipient | |
| Evan G. Galbraith | Alpha | 1994 | National | U.S. Ambassador to France | |
| Edward "Skip" Gnehm | Eta | 1964 | Line | U.S. Ambassador to Kuwait, U.S. Ambassador to Australia, U.S. Ambassador to Jordan | |
| H. Allen Holmes | Alpha | 2007 | National | U.S. Ambassador to Portugal | |
| George R. Houston Jr. | Alpha | 1964 | National | President of Mount St. Mary's University, professor at Georgetown University | |
| Eric G. John | Alpha | 1978 | Line | U.S. Ambassador to Thailand | |
| Jan Karski | Alpha | 1964 | National | Georgetown University professor, Presidential Medal of Freedom recipient | |
| Thomas M. King | Alpha | 2005 | National | Professor of theology at Georgetown University | |
| William Knowland | Alpha | 1951 | National | United States Senate | |
| Evan Kohlmann | Alpha | 1998 | Line | Founder CEO of Cloudburst Technologies | |
| Frank Lavin | Alpha | 1975 | Line | U.S. Ambassador to Singapore | |
| Edward B. Lawson | Alpha | 1924 | Line | U.S. Ambassador to Iceland, U.S. Ambassador to Israel | |
| Paul M. A. Linebarger | Alpha | 1953 | National | author | |
| Raymond P. Ludden | Alpha | 1928 | Line | China expert for the U.S. State Department | |
| Douglas MacArthur II | Alpha | 1956 | National | U.S. Ambassador to Japan, U.S. Ambassador to Belgium, U.S. Ambassador to Austria, U.S. Ambassador to Iran | |
| Thaddeus M. Machrowicz | Alpha | 1959 | National | U.S. House of Representatives; Judge of the United States District Court for the Eastern District of Michigan | |
| Philip W. Manhard | Delta | 1942 | Line | U.S. Ambassador to Mauritius | |
| Jesse A. Mann | Alpha | 1966 | National | Dean of the Edmund A. Walsh School of Foreign Service at Georgetown University | |
| Grady Louis McMurtry | Epsilon | 1954 | Line | Occultist and revivor of Ordo Templi Orientis | |
| Nicholas Onuf | Alpha | 1967 | National | Professor emeritus of international relations at Florida International University | |
| Donald Lawrence O'Toole | Alpha | 1951 | National | U.S. House of Representatives | |
| Ibrahim Oweiss | Alpha | 1968 | National | Professor of economics emeritus at Georgetown University | |
| Samuel Potolicchio | Alpha | 2015 | National | director of global and custom education at McCourt School of Public Policy, Georgetown University | |
| Earl Ravenal | Alpha | 1994 | National | Professor at Georgetown University | |
| Christopher R. Reich | Alpha | 1979 | Line | novelist | |
| Claude G. Ross | Delta | 1938 | Line | U.S. Ambassador to Central African Republic, U.S. Ambassador to Haïti, U.S. Ambassador to Tanzania | |
| Abdul Aziz Said | Pi | 1967 | National | professor in the School of International Service at American University | |
| Harry Sandager | Alpha | 1920 | Line | U.S. Representative from Rhode Island | |
| Robert A. Scalapin | Epsilon | 1950 | National | professor emeritus at the University of California, Berkeley | |
| Howard B. Schaffer | Alpha | 2005 | National | U.S. Ambassador to Bangladesh, Deputy Assistant Secretary of State | |
| Ken Starr | Eta | 1967 | Line | Solicitor General of the United States | |
| Mark von Hagen | Alpha | 1972 | Line | Professor of history at Arizona State University | |
| Rufus B. von KleinSmid | Delta | 1923 | Line | President of the University of Arizona, chancellor of the University of Southern California | |
| John Wood | Alpha | 1996 | National | Chancellor of the University of Canterbury, deputy secretary of foreign affairs of New Zealand, New Zealand Ambassador to the United States | |

== Member misconduct ==
=== Scandals ===
In July 2018, The Chronicle of Higher Education published several accounts of student and alumni fraternity members accusing Terrence Boyle of sexism and bigotry. Boyle has served as the fraternity's general secretary for nearly 40 years, controlled the alumni newsletter, and oversaw pledge recruitment for the Alpha chapter. Charges included making the sorority members clean the bedrooms and wash the socks of the fraternity members. In addition, no females had held national leadership positions. In the article and in a petition shortly following it, leaders from most fraternity chapters, along with many non-DPE Fraternity members, called for Boyle's resignation. In August 2018, the Alpha chapter officers resigned and closed the chapter's activities after Georgetown University's student newspaper, The Hoya, published an opinion piece authored by presidents of Eta, Chi, and Pi chapters calling for Georgetown students to boycott Alpha chapter. Boyle appointed new student leadership for the Alpha chapter from outside of Georgetown; however, several of the fraternity's other chapters indicated that they would not recognize this new leadership.

=== D.C. attorney general litigation ===
On June 1, 2020, Terrence J. Boyle, the treasurer of DPE, Inc., donated Alpha House to a separate corporation named the Delta Phi Epsilon Foundation for Foreign Service Education. In 2021, the District of Columbia attorney general, Karl Racine, filed a case against Boyle, the Foundation for Foreign Service Education, and the Delta Phi Epsilon corporation. The complaint alleged that Boyle unlawfully used charitable funds belonging to the foundation to buy a house on 34th Street NW in 1990. In addition, Boyle sold the fraternity's chapter house for $2.6 million when it was appraised for $4 million. Boyle, the and Matthew W. Schmidt, the president of DPE, secretly transferred ownership of the fraternity house from the fraternity to the foundation.

Journalists Fredrick Kunkle and Jonetta Rose Barras published several articles about the scandals. In January 2022, Brian Schwalb became the second elected Attorney General of the District of Columbia. In April 2022, the Office of the Attorney General filed a motion for summary judgment in the case. In September 2021, the D.C. Superior Court issued an Order for Partial Summary Judgment. The court ruled that the defendants breached their fiduciary duties. The Order was signed by D.C. Superior Court Judge, Judge Shana Frost Matini.

On November 30, 2023, the D.C. Office of the Attorney General and the three defendants signed a consent judgment, which was approved by the D.C. Superior Court, requiring Boyleto make a restitution payment in the amount of $100,000. Boyle was barred from being an officer, director, trustee, or employee of any nonprofit organizations operating in the District of Columbia for ten years. Schmidt was barred from being a director of DPE in the future.

== See also ==
- Professional fraternities and sororities
