= Epididymis evolution from reptiles to mammals =

The epididymis, which is a tube that connects a testicle to a vas deferens in the male reproductive system, evolved by retention of the mesonephric duct during regression and replacement of the mesonephros with the metanephric kidney. Similarly, during embryological involution of the paired mesonephric kidneys, each mesonephric duct is retained to become the epididymis, vas deferens, seminal vesicle and ejaculatory duct (Wolffian duct). In reptiles and birds both the testes and excurrent ducts (efferent ducts, epididymis, vas deferens) occur in an intra-abdominal location (testicond). Primitive mammals, such as the monotremes (prototheria), also are testicond. Marsupial (metatheria) and placental (eutheria) mammals exhibit differing degrees of testicular descent into an extra-abdominal scrotum. In scrotal mammals the epididymis is attached to the testes in an extra-abdominal position where the cauda epididymis extends beyond the lowest extremity of the testis. Hence, the cauda epididymis is exposed to the coolest of temperatures compared to all other reproductive structures.

Whereas testicond reptiles contain an excurrent duct system, they lack male reproductive glands (absent seminal vesicles, prostate, bulbourethral glands). Monotreme mammals are also testicond (like reptiles) and contain some, but not all (absent seminal vesicles) of the male reproductive glands observed in most metatherian and eutherian mammals. This combination of reptilian and mammalian structures within the monotreme reproductive tract has informed the evolution of the male reproductive tract in mammals. For example, the intra-abdominal low sperm storage capacity of the echidna (Tachyglossus aculeatus) epididymis informed the role of the epididymis as the prime mover in the evolution of descended testes in mammals as it relates to lower extra-gonadal temperatures enhancing epididymal sperm storage in scrotal mammals. Furthermore, the structure of the monotreme reproductive tract also informed prostate evolution in monotreme mammals.

== Structural differentiation of the epididymis in reptiles ==
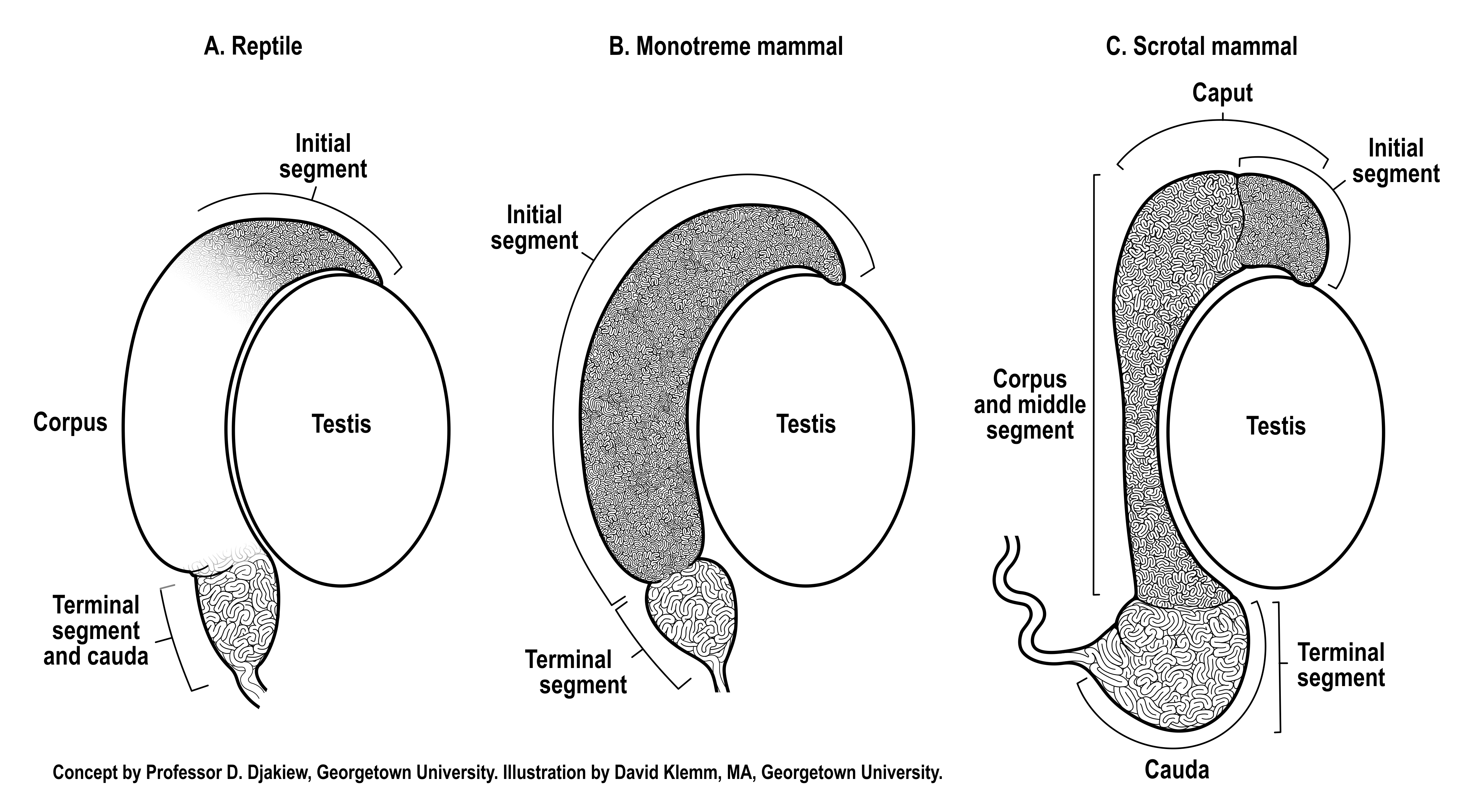
Figure 1: Schematic diagrams of the epididymis of a reptile (A), monotreme mammal (B) and scrotal mammal (C) showing the anatomical caput, corpus and cauda, and the histologic initial segment, middle segment and terminal segment.

The reptilian testis and epididymis typically undergo seasonal recrudescence coupled to the breeding season. All reptiles retain their testes and excurrent ducts within the abdomen (testicond). Generally, the reptilian epididymis does not exhibit the same degree of anatomical regionalization compared to scrotal mammals (Figure 1). Indeed, the anatomical appearance of the epididymis of many reptiles appears much more similar to the epididymis of monotremes than scrotal mammals (Figure 1). Anatomically, the gross morphologic features of the reptilian epididymis can vary between species, with some species of reptiles exhibiting just two anatomical regions whereas others (snakes) may exhibit no observable regionalization of the epididymis.

A reptilian histologic initial segment of the epididymis has been extensively documented in several species homologous to the initial segment of mammals. The initial segment of the epididymis, first described in the guinea pig epididymis, is a histologically distinct region of tall pseudostratified columnar epithelium that receives spermatozoa from the ductuli efferentes (Figure 1).

The epididymis is the primary sperm storage organ in male reptiles. In all reptiles and mammals the sperm storage region of the epididymis can objectively be identified as that distal extremity of the epididymis that exhibits a widened diameter of duct which contains additional layers of circumferential smooth muscle capable of contraction during ejaculation in direct continuity with the vas deferens (Figure 1). This sperm storage region has been described as the anatomical cauda epididymis or the histologic terminal segment of the epididymis. The caudal region of the reptilian epididymis, where sperm are stored, is an anatomical extension that narrows into a conical shape before forming the vas deferens. The coiled epididymal duct within the cauda epididymis does not appear to be particularly long, and so may be limited in its capacity to store sperm in comparison to scrotal mammals. Limited sperm storage in the reptilian epididymis may be circumvented by the ability of female reptiles to store viable spermatozoa within their reproductive tract for utilization months or years after insemination. A competing reproductive strategy to long-term sperm storage that explains the production of offspring after prolonged periods in the absence of males is facultative parthenogenesis. In either case, these female reproductive strategies may have evolved to counter limited sperm storage in the reptilian male epididymis.

== Structural differentiation of the epididymis in monotreme mammals ==
The monotremes (short beaked echidna, long beaked echidna, platypus) are testicond seasonal breeding mammals that exhibit some characteristics of the reproductive tract found in reptiles (e.g. testicond, presence of a cloaca). The fully developed monotreme epididymis exhibits two anatomical regions, similar to some reptiles. The two anatomical regions of the monotreme epididymis closely correspond to just two histologic regions (Figure 1B), an initial segment and a terminal segment. Structural differentiation of the epididymis into just an initial segment and terminal segment, with no intervening middle segment, has also subsequently been observed as far back as the epididymis of sharks. In the monotreme echidna, the initial segment, where sperm undergo maturation, is much larger than the terminal segment (Figure 1B), the later segment being the sperm storage region of the epididymis. In the monotreme echidna, the proportion (26% of total) of mature sperm stored intra-abdominally in the terminal segment of the epididymis is considerably less than the proportion of mature sperm stored in the epididymis of many eutherian mammals (50-75% of total) with descended testes. Hence, both reptiles and the monotreme echidna appear to have relatively limited sperm storage capacity in the testicond epididymis compared to mammals with the epididymis located in an extra-abdominal scrotum. This reduced sperm storage capacity of the monotreme testicond epididymis is further supported by observations that the sperm storage region of the epididymis of a testicond mammal (echidna) and a scrotal mammal (rat) are respectively 4% and 8% of the total length of the duct. Significantly, the low intra-abdominal sperm storage capacity of the echidna epididymis helped inform the role of the epididymis as a prime mover in the evolution of descended testes in mammals whereby lower extra-gonadal temperatures within the scrotal cauda epididymis reduces oxidative respiration of sperm, which enhances oxygen availability, thereby allowing greater epididymal sperm storage in the cooler scrotum of mammals.

== Structural differentiation of the epididymis in marsupials and placental mammals ==
Most species of marsupial (metatherian) and placental (eutherian) mammals have evolved extra-gonadal testes, although a limited number of these mammals remain testicond or exhibit differing degrees of testicular descent. As a result of the epididymis being attached to the testis, and the cauda epididymis extending below the lower extremity of the testis (Figure 1C), it was proposed that the epididymis was the prime mover in the evolution of testicular decent, whereby the cauda epididymis preceded the testis into a scrotal location.

The epididymis of marsupials (metatherians) and placental mammals (eutherians) has undergone further structural differentiation compared to that observed in prototherian mammals (Figure 1). In scrotal mammals, an initial segment is nearly always observed, however, additional histologically distinct regions have developed between the initial segment and the distal sperm storage region (terminal segment). These intervening histologic regions have been referred to as the middle segment. The histologic regions of the middle segment (Figure 1C) can vary in number in metatherian and eutherian species of mammals. Beyond the histologic regions of the middle segment, the sperm storage region (anatomical cauda, histologic terminal segment) of scrotal mammals has enlarged to accommodate enhanced storage of sperm (Figure 1C). The storage of sperm in the scrotal epididymis is enhanced by cooler extra-abdominal temperatures. Indeed, experimental reflection of one epididymis into the warmer temperature of an abdominal location reduced sperm storage capacity by 75% compared to the contralateral epididymis that remained in the scrotum. Significantly, cooler scrotal temperatures reduces oxidative respiration of sperm, thereby increasing oxygen availability to store more sperm per unit volume of duct, which has informed the evolution of descended testes in mammals.

== Trends in the evolution of the epididymis from testicond reptiles and monotremes to scrotal mammals ==
A histologically distinct initial segment of the epididymis is widely observed in many species of reptiles and even as far back as sharks. A large initial segment is also present in the epididymis of the testicond monotreme echidna. Furthermore, the scrotal epididymis of metatherian and eutherian mammals nearly all exhibit an initial segment which may contain histologically distinct sub-zones therein. Hence, the initial segment of the epididymis is well conserved in testicond vertebrates (reptiles, monotremes) and in scrotal metatherian and eutherian mammals (Figure 1).

The status of the histologic middle segment of the epididymis in reptiles is incompletely defined (Figure 1A). Considering the wide variation in the anatomical structures of the four orders (Crocodilia, Sphenodontia, Squamata, Testudines) of reptilian epididymides and the paucity of histologic studies that correlate anatomical structure to histology, the evolution of the middle segment in reptiles, if present, remains to be delineated. In contrast, extensive studies of the echidna epididymis show that the monotreme epididymis lacks a middle segment. It is only in metatherian and eutherian mammals that a middle segment has been extensively documented. Whereas the initial segment of the epididymis often contains histologically distinct sub-zones therein, the downstream zones that collectively constitute the middle segment most likely evolved from the upstream sub-zones of the initial segment.

The histologic terminal segment is the sperm storage region of the epididymis in reptiles, monotremes and both metatherian and eutherian mammals (Figure 1). The testicond epididymis (reptiles and monotremes) has a limited sperm storage capacity compared with the scrotal epididymis (metatherian and eutherian mammals), which has a much larger terminal segment to accommodate increased sperm storage. It is the cooler temperature of the scrotal epididymis that reduces oxidative respiration of sperm in the terminal segment, thereby increasing oxygen availability to store more sperm per unit volume of duct, thus informing the evolution of descended testes in mammals.

Whereas different and multiple histologic sub-regions may or may not occur within any segment of the epididymis, the histologic description of the epididymis consisting of an initial segment, middle segment and terminal segment provides a harmonized characterization that allows direct comparisons of homologous segments across species.

== Summary and conclusion ==
The evolution of the epididymis from reptiles to mammals (Figure 1) entailed:

1. Retention of the histologic initial segment.
2. To varying degrees, elaboration of a histologic middle segment.
3. An increase in the length, volume and size of the histologic terminal segment of scrotal mammals, whereby the lower extra-abdominal (scrotal) temperature increased oxygen availability to sustain and store more sperm, thus providing a physiologic mechanism for the evolution of descended testes in mammals.
