= Delta Phi Epsilon =

Delta Phi Epsilon (ΔΦΕ) may refer to:

- Delta Phi Epsilon (professional), the professional foreign service fraternity and sorority
- Delta Phi Epsilon (social), a social sorority
