= Robert Lieber =

- Born: Chicago, Illinois
- Occupation: Professor
- Spouse: Nancy (m. 1964)
- Children: 2

Academic background
- Education: University of Wisconsin–Madison (B.A.); Harvard University (Ph.D.)

Academic work
- Institutions: Georgetown University

Robert J. Lieber (born September 29, 1941) is an American academic and Professor of Government and International Affairs at Georgetown University in Washington, D.C. Lieber is the author or editor of eighteen books and has served as the Chair of the Government Department and as Interim Chair of Psychology.

== Education ==
Lieber completed his undergraduate degree in political science at the University of Wisconsin. Lieber spent a year in the Ph.D. program at the University of Chicago, where he studied with the distinguished realist scholar Hans Morgenthau. Lieber continued his graduate program in Government at Harvard, earning his doctorate in political science in 1968. At Harvard, Lieber took classes from distinguished scholars including Stanley Hoffmann, Samuel H. Beer, Louis Hartz, and the future Secretary of State, Henry Kissinger. Lieber began his academic career as an assistant professor at the University of California, Davis. During his years at UCD, he took a number of research leaves, including a year's postgraduate study at St. Antony's College, Oxford and visiting research appointments at the Harvard Center for International Affairs, the Atlantic Institute and the Fondation Nationale des Sciences Politiques in Paris, and the Woodrow Wilson Center and Brookings Institution in Washington. He was appointed to a professorship at Georgetown in 1982.

=== Public Intellectual ===
Lieber has been invited on to various outlets to discuss topics including oil prices, American declinism, and American foreign policy strategy. He has been on The Diane Rehm Show, PBS Newshour and NBC's NewsConference to address current events and publicize his books. Lieber has appeared on American cable network programs, such as CNN's Crossfire and the O'Reilly Factor, as well as international television sources such as Al Jazeera and BBC. He has also been used as a source for the Washington Post, Christian Science Monitor, National Interest Online, and Roll Call for stories ranging from the Obama administration's foreign policy to Donald Trump, ISIS, and the 2016 Presidential Election.

In the policy realm, he has served as an advisor to several presidential campaigns, to the State Department, and to the drafters of U.S. National Intelligence Estimates. In early 1991, Lieber participated in a debate with Christopher Hitchens at Georgetown over the merits of the First Gulf War. Lieber supported the war while Hitchens opposed it.

== Publications ==
Lieber has authored nine books since 1970, mostly on international relations theory, U.S. foreign policy, petroleum politics and European affairs. He has been the editor or co-editor of eight other books in the field. His later books have examined American engagement and retrenchment in the 21st century, published by Cambridge University Press.

He has written pieces for the Washington Post, New York Times, National Interest, Los Angeles Times, Baltimore Sun, Christian Science Monitor, Harper's, and Salon.

=== "Reductio ad Iraqum" ===
In his 2005 book, The American Era: Power and Strategy for the 21st Century, Lieber coined the neologism "Reductio ad Iraqum," to refer to the contentious political climate after the 2003 invasion of Iraq where debate on major foreign policy dilemmas often devolved into the blame game and reductive arguments over the consequences of the war. The phrase has continued to circulate around foreign policy analysis for at least a decade after its inception.

== Personal life ==
Lieber appeared in Alfred Hitchcock's 1959 thriller North by Northwest as an extra.

== Works ==
- The Oil Decade: Conflict and Cooperation in the West (1983)
- Eagle entangled : U.S. foreign policy in a complex world (1979)
- Eagle defiant : United States foreign policy in the 1980s (1983)
- Eagle resurgent?: the Reagan era in American foreign policy (1987)
- Eagle in a new world : American grand strategy in the post-Cold War era (1992)
- Eagle adrift: American foreign policy at the end of the century (1997)
- Eagle rules?: foreign policy and American primacy in the twenty-first century (2002)
- The American Era: Power and Strategy for the 21st Century (2005)
- Power and Willpower in the American Future (2012)
- Retreat and its Consequences: American Foreign Policy and the Problem of World Order (2016)
- Indispensable Nation: American Foreign Policy in a Turbulent World (2022)

== See also ==
- List of Georgetown University Faculty
- Declinism
- American Exceptionalism
- National Intelligence Estimate
- Council on Foreign Relations
