= Zoe Bush =

American judge (born 1954)

Senior Judge of the Superior Court of the District of Columbia
- Incumbent
- Assumed office October 27, 2017

Associate Judge of the Superior Court of the District of Columbia
- In office July 18, 1994 – October 27, 2017
- Nominated by: Bill Clinton
- Preceded by: Fred B. Ugast
- Succeeded by: Shana Frost Matini

Personal details
- Born: Zoe Alice Bush; July 5, 1954 (age 70); Little Rock, Arkansas, U.S.
- Children: 1
- Education: Wellesley College (BA); Harvard University (JD)

Zoe Alice Bush (born July 5, 1954) is an American lawyer serving as a senior judge of the Superior Court of the District of Columbia. Bush first took her position on July 18, 1994, and assumed senior status on October 27, 2017.

== Early life and education ==
Bush was born and raised in Little Rock, Arkansas. She earned a Bachelor of Arts degree from Wellesley College in 1976 and a Juris Doctor from Harvard Law School in 1979.

== Career ==
After graduating from law school, Bush served as a law clerk for Judge James F. Merow. She later clerked for Judge Philip Nichols Jr. before joining the Washington Gas Light Company as a rate lawyer. In 1984, she joined Potomac Electric Power Company's Office of General Counsel. Bush was appointed to serve as an administrative judge of the Washington, D.C. Contract Appeals Board and later served as the board's chief administrative judge. In 1994, President Bill Clinton appointed Bush to serve as an associate judge of the Superior Court of the District of Columbia. She assumed senior status on October 27, 2017.
