= Institute for Law, Science and Global Security =

Georgetown University institute

Coordinates: 38.8878°N 77.095°W

The Institute for Law, Science and Global Security in the Department of Government at Georgetown University was established to promote teaching and research in the area of intersection between international law and international relations. The Institute sponsors undergraduate and graduate courses and runs a Master's Program in International Law and Global Security. The Institute seeks to inform the public policy debate about the nature, role and importance of international law as it connected to issues of science and global security. To this end, it sponsors a series of specific programs including the Program on Non-Proliferation Law and Policy, which is jointly run with the James Martin Center of the Monterey Institute of International Studies.

Most recently, the Institute has begun a special initiative in the area of cyber security. Among the participants in this initiative have been former Director of the Central Intelligence Agency General Michael Hayden, Siobhan Gorman, national security correspondent of The Wall Street Journal, and Suzanne Spaulding, former General Counsel for the Senate Select Committee on Intelligence. Since its creation, the Institute has also sponsored events with a variety of other speakers, including Paul D. Clement, former Solicitor General of the United States, Bill Richardson, the Governor of New Mexico, Neal Katyal, Deputy Solicitor General of the United States and legal counsel to former detainee Salim Hamdan, and David H. Remes, a former partner at Covington & Burling and currently representing detainees in the Guantanamo Bay detention camps.

The Institute was founded by Professors Christopher C. Joyner and Anthony Clark Arend, and was initially called The Institute for International Law and Politics. It is currently directed by Professor Joyner, and Professor Catherine Lotrionte serves as the Associate Director of the Institute. Amit Yoran, former Chief of the National Cyber Security Division at the Department of Homeland Security and Phillip A. Karber serve on the Board of Advisers of the Institute. From 2007 to 2009, Brendan P. Geary—previously an Associate Attorney at Gibson, Dunn & Crutcher LLP and currently an Attorney in the Department of Justice's National Security Division—served as the Institute's William V. O'Brien Fellow.
