= Robert J. Beck =

American academic

- Born: 1961 (age 64–65); Milwaukee, Wisconsin
- Education: Marquette University; Georgetown University
- Occupation: UWM Associate Professor
- Website: http://people.uwm.edu/rjbeck/

Robert J. Beck (born 1961) is an educator and scholar of international law and international relations.

== Education ==
Born in Milwaukee, Wisconsin and educated at Marquette University High School, Beck received an Honors B.A. (Political Science, History, Latin), Phi Beta Kappa, from Marquette University in 1983. He received MA (1985) and PhD (1989, with distinction) degrees in International Politics from Georgetown University's Department of Government. Beck also participated in law institutes at New York University's School of Law, the University of Virginia's School of Law, and Dartmouth College.

== Academic career ==
An Associate Professor of Political Science at the University of Wisconsin–Milwaukee, Beck has also taught in the International Studies and Global Studies degree programs.

From January 2014 until January 2023, Dr. Beck served as UWM's Associate Vice Chancellor and Chief Information Officer. From 2003-2013, he was Chief Information Officer of UWM's College of Letters and Science. From 2000 until July 2011 he served as Director of Academic Technology at UWM's Center for International Education. From 1998-2000, he served as Director of Tufts University's Center for Teaching Excellence. Beck earlier taught at the University of Virginia (Government & Foreign Affairs, 1989–90, 91-98) and the University of Minnesota (Political Science, 1990–91).

Beck has been a regular scholarly collaborator with his long-time friend, Anthony Clark Arend. Beginning in 2003, he was also a guest on the television series, "International Focus", produced by the Institute of World Affairs at the University of Wisconsin-Milwaukee. In addition, Dr. Beck has been featured in podcasts such as Georgetown University's “SFS ONLINE & ON TOPIC: Russia, Ukraine, and International Law,” with Dr. Anthony Clark Arend on March 18, 2022.

== Bibliography ==
- Law and Disciplinarity: Thinking beyond Borders (editor, 2013)
- International Law volume of International Studies Encyclopedia (co-editor, with Henry F. Carey, 2010)
- International Law and the Rise of Nations (co-editor, with Thomas Ambrosio, 2001)
- International Rules: Approaches from International Law and International Relations (co-editor, with Anthony Clark Arend and Robert Vander Lugt, 1996)
- International Law and the Use of Force (co-author, with Anthony Clark Arend, second edition forthcoming, 1993 first edition)
- The Grenada Invasion: Politics, Law, and Foreign Policy Decisionmaking (author, 1993)
