= Georgetown Institute for Consumer Research =

Academic institute at Georgetown University

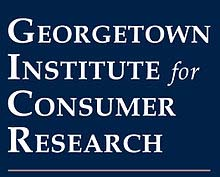
- The Georgetown Institute for Consumer Research logo
- Type: Academic institute
- Established: 2012
- Parent institution: McDonough School of Business; Georgetown University
- Location: Washington, D.C.
- Website: msb.georgetown.edu/gicr

The Georgetown Institute for Consumer Research (GICR) is an academic institute within the McDonough School of Business at Georgetown University that was founded in 2012.

The Georgetown Institute for Consumer Research (GICR) seeks to advance research that builds an understanding of consumers, with a focus on data analytics. GICR has several goals:
•Support faculty research in consumer analytics and insights;
•Develop student expertise in consumer analytics through offerings such as the MBA Certificate in Consumer Analytics and Insights;
•Collaborate with organizations interested in consumer analytics and insights; and
•Convene stakeholders for events related to consumer analytics and insights.

== Background ==
McDonough School of Business, home of the institute, is part of Georgetown University, founded in Washington, D.C. in 1789. The institute shares the university’s mission to produce knowledge and educate leaders to address the most significant challenges and opportunities facing business and society. Other centers and initiatives that the McDonough School of Business supports include, but are not limited to, the Center for Business & Public Policy, Center for Financial Markets and Policy, Real Estate Finance Initiative, Entrepreneurship Initiative, Global Business Initiative, Global Social Enterprise Initiative, Women's Leadership Initiative, and the Institute for the Study of Markets and Ethics.
