= Anthony Clark Arend =

American international relations scholar

- Arend in 2009

Academic background
- Education: School of Foreign Service at Georgetown University (BSFS); University of Virginia (M.A., Ph.D.)

Academic work
- Institutions: Georgetown University

Anthony Clark Arend is an American international relations scholar. He is Professor of Government and Foreign Service and served as department chair of the Department of Government at Georgetown University from 2020-2026.

== Education ==
Arend received a Ph.D. (1985) and an M.A. (1982) in Foreign Affairs from the Department of Government and Foreign Affairs of the University of Virginia. He received a B.S.F.S. (1980), magna cum laude, from the Edmund A. Walsh School of Foreign Service at Georgetown University. In 1978/79, Arend spent two semesters at the University of Trier as an exchange student.

== Career ==
Arend has served his entire professional career at Georgetown University, his undergraduate alma mater. Prior to joining Georgetown's faculty, he was a Senior Fellow at the Center for National Security Law at the University of Virginia School of Law.

From August 2015 until July 2018, he served as Senior Associate Dean (and later Vice Dean) for Graduate and Faculty Affairs at Georgetown's Walsh School of Foreign Service. He also served as Director of the Master of Science in Foreign Service Program at the Walsh School from 2008 to 2017. With Christopher C. Joyner, he founded the Institute for International Law and Politics (now called the Institute for Law, Science and Global Security) at Georgetown University and served as its co-director from 2003 to 2008. He has also served as an adjunct professor of law at the Georgetown University Law Center.

From 2005 to 2009, he edited the blog Exploring International Law. He is a member of the Council on Foreign Relations and previously served as Chair of the Faculty Editorial Board of Georgetown University Press.

In 2014, Arend and Ambassador Mark P. Lagon, former director of the US Office to Monitor and Combat Trafficking in Persons, published Human Dignity and the Future of Global Institutions.

He served as department chair of the Department of Government at Georgetown University from 2020-2026, and is Professor of Government and Foreign Service.

In 2024, Arend became an Executive Producer of the forthcoming film, Sagittaria, written and directed by Zach Busch. He also plays the role of Carl Tuckington in the film.

== Specializations and research interests ==
Arend specializes in international law, international organizations, international relations, international legal philosophy, and constitutional law of United States foreign relations. In his theoretical work, he has applied constructivist international relation theory to international law.

== Recognition ==
In April 2017, Arend received the John Carroll Award from the Georgetown University Alumni Association, which is conferred upon Georgetown alumni "whose achievements and record of service exemplify the ideals and traditions of Georgetown and its founder" and is the highest honor given by the Alumni Association.

== Bibliography ==
Arend is the author, co-author, or co-editor of several books, including:

- Legal Rules and International Society
- Human Dignity and the Future of Global Institutions (with Mark P. Lagon)
- International Rules (with Robert J. Beck and Robert Vander Lugt)
- International Law and the Use of Force: Beyond the United Nations Charter Paradigm (with Robert J. Beck)
- Pursuing a Just and Durable Peace: John Foster Dulles and International Organization
- The Falklands War: Lessons for Strategy, Diplomacy, and International Law (with Alberto R. Coll)
