= Reena Aggarwal (academic) =

American academic and scholar

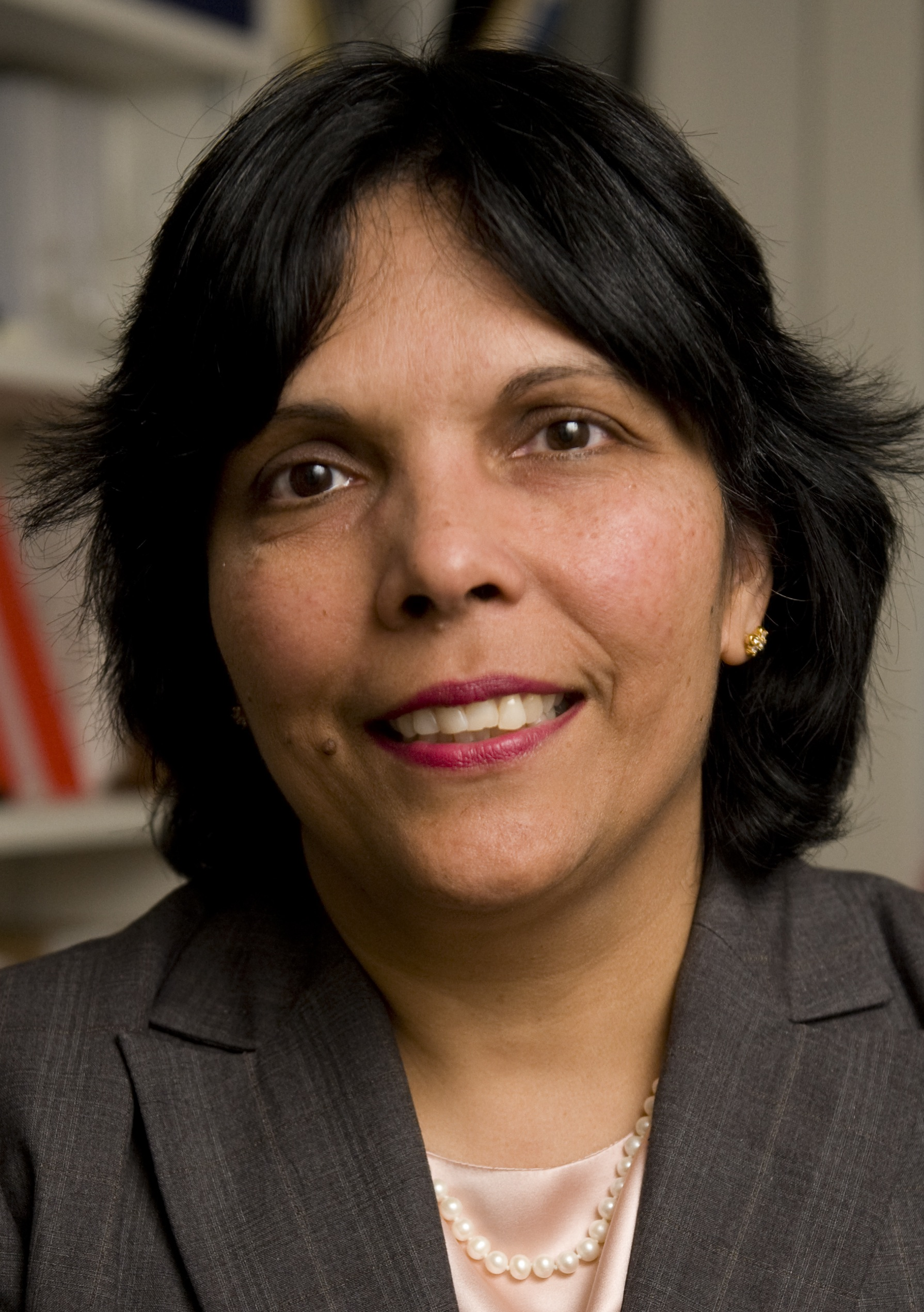

Academic background
- Education: University of Maryland and Birla Institute of Technology and Science (BITS)

Academic work
- Discipline: Finance
- Institutions: Georgetown University

Reena Aggarwal is an American academic and finance scholar. She is the Robert E. McDonough Professor of Finance and Director of the Psaros Center for Financial Markets and Policy at Georgetown University’s McDonough School of Business. Her research focuses on global financial markets and market regulation, market microstructure, private markets, initial public offerings (IPOs) and capital raising, exchange-traded funds (ETFs), corporate governance and proxy voting, institutional investors, and digital assets.

== Education ==
Aggarwal received a Ph.D. in finance from the University of Maryland and an M.M.S. from the Birla Institute of Technology and Science (BITS), India.

== Career ==
Aggarwal’s work combines empirical research with institutional knowledge about financial market institutions and regulation. Her research and analysis have been cited in media outlets including Bloomberg, CNBC, CNN, Financial Times, Forbes, The New York Times, The Wall Street Journal, and The Washington Post.

She has held administrative leadership roles at Georgetown University, including Vice Provost for Faculty, Interim Dean, and Deputy Dean of the McDonough School of Business.

Aggarwal has also served as a Pembroke Visiting Professor in International Finance at University of Cambridge, Visiting Professor of Finance at the MIT Sloan School of Management, as a FINRA Academic Fellow, and as an Academic Fellow at the U.S. Securities and Exchange Commission. She was a Visiting Research Scholar at the International Monetary Fund (IMF), a Fulbright Scholar to Brazil, a Distinguished Scholar at CAFRAL (Reserve Bank of India), and member of the World Economic Forum Global Agenda Council on the Future of Financing and Capital.

She has served in leadership roles in professional associations, including as President of the Financial Management Association International, and has served on boards of the American Finance Association, Western Finance Association, and European Corporate Governance Institute (ECGI). She is a Senior Fellow of the Asian Bureau of Finance and Economic Research.

In addition to academic work, Aggarwal serves on the boards of financial services firms.

== Honors and awards ==
- Poets & Quants “50 Best Undergraduate Business School Professors” (2025).
- Georgetown University President’s Award for Distinguished Scholar-Teachers (2024).
- Favorite Professors of the ‘Best & Brightest’ Executive MBAs, Poets and Quants (2016).
- Voted as the Outstanding Professor by EMBA students (2012).
- BlackRock–National Association of Corporate Directors Global Challenge for Innovation in Corporate Governance Award (2015).
- Distinguished Alumnus Award by BITS Pilani, 2018.
- Allan N. Nash Distinguished Doctoral Graduate Award by University of Maryland, 2003.

== Georgetown Psaros Center for Financial Markets and Policy ==
In 2010, Aggarwal founded Georgetown University's Center for Financial Markets and Policy in the aftermath of the 2008 financial crisis. In 2022, the center was renamed the Psaros Center for Financial Markets and Policy following an $11 million gift from the Psaros family.

The center conducts academic research and convenes discussions on financial markets and regulation, with impartial programming that connects research, policy, and practice. At center events, Dr. Aggarwal has interviewed several financial leaders including the CEOs of JP Morgan and Goldman Sachs, the chair of the U.S. Securities and Exchange Commission, and vice chair for supervision of the Federal Reserve Board.

== Publications ==
=== Books ===
- Digital Assets: Pricing, Allocation and Regulation (co-edited with Paolo Tasca). Cambridge University Press, 2025.
- Migrant Labor Remittances in South Asia (with Samuel Maimbo, Richard Adams, and Nikos Passas). World Bank Publications, 2005.

=== Selected journal articles ===
- Aggarwal, Reena; Wu, Yanbin (November 16, 2025). "Price Discovery from Offer Price to Opening Price of Initial Public Offerings". Journal of Financial and Quantitative Analysis. 60 (7): 3443–3474. doi:10.1017/S0022109024000929 – via Cambridge University Press.
- Aggarwal, Reena; Bai, Jennie; Laeven, Luc (December 16, 2021). "Safe-Asset Shortages: Evidence from the European Government Bond Lending Market". Journal of Financial and Quantitative Analysis. 56 (8): 2689–2719. doi:10.1017/S0022109020000770 – via Cambridge University Press.
- Reena, Aggarwal; Sandeep, Dahiya; Nagpurnanand, Prabhala (March 22, 2016). "The Power of Shareholder Votes: Evidence from Uncontested Director Elections". SSRN 2609532.
- Reena, Aggarwal; Pedro, Saffi; Jason, Sturgess (November 2014). "The Role of Institutional Investors in Voting: Evidence from the Securities Lending Market". SSRN 2023480.
- Aggarwal, R., Demirgüç-Kunt, A., Martínez Pería, M. S. (2011). Do remittances promote financial development? Journal of Development Economics, 96(2), 255–264. https://openknowledge.worldbank.org/server/api/core/bitstreams/e0876549-f575-50aa-a7b9-e0833364b377/content
- Aggarwal, R., Erel, I., Ferreira, M. A., Matos, P. (2011). Does governance travel around the world? Evidence from institutional investors. Journal of Financial Economics, 100(1), 154–182. SSRN 1361143
- Aggarwal, R., Erel, I., Stulz, R., Williamson, R. (2009). Differences in governance practices between U.S. and foreign firms: Measurement, causes, and consequences. Review of Financial Studies, 22, 3131–3169.https://www.nber.org/system/files/working_papers/w13288/w13288.pdf
- Aggarwal, R., Dahiya, S. (2006). Demutualization and public offerings of financial exchanges. Journal of Applied Corporate Finance, 18(3), 96–103.SSRN 859305
- Reena, Aggarwal; Nagpurnanand, Prabhala; Manju, Puri (July 1, 2002). "Institutional Allocation in Initial Public Offerings: Empirical Evidence". SSRN 319746.
- Reena, Aggarwal (February 16, 2000). "Stabilization Activities by Underwriters After Initial Public Offerings". SSRN 1690562.
- Aggarwal, R., Conroy, P. (2000). Price discovery in initial public offerings and role of the lead underwriter. The Journal of Finance, 55(6), 2903–2922 SSRN 1690555
