= Testicondy =

In biology, testicondy in a species is the condition of having testicles situated within the abdomen as the normal anatomy of that species. Testicondy can be further classified into primary testicondy and secondary testicondy. The testes of mammals such as monotremes, elephants, sirenians and cetaceans are testicond.

== See also ==
- Testicular descent
