= Shana Frost Matini =

American judge (born 1970)

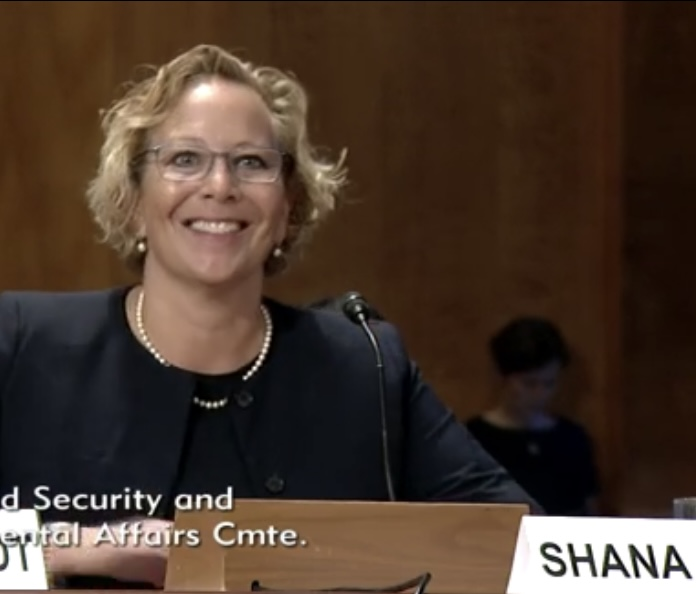

Associate Judge of the Superior Court of the District of Columbia
- Incumbent
- Assumed office August 2019
- President: Donald Trump
- Preceded by: Zoe Bush

Magistrate Judge of the Superior Court of the District of Columbia
- In office 2016–2019

Personal details
- Born: Shana Lyn Malinowski; April 18, 1970 (age 56) Vineland, New Jersey, U.S.
- Education: George Washington University (BA); University of the District of Columbia (JD)

Shana Frost Matini (born April 18, 1970) is an American lawyer and jurist serving as an associate judge of the Superior Court of the District of Columbia. Matini served as a magistrate judge on the Superior Court from 2016 to 2019.

== Education ==
Matini was born in Vineland, New Jersey. She earned a Bachelor of Arts degree from George Washington University and a Juris Doctor from the David A. Clarke School of Law at the University of the District of Columbia. After law school, she clerked for Richard A. Levie of the Superior Court of the District of Columbia.

== Career ==
Prior to becoming a judge, Matini taught English at the Language Teacher's Training College in Slupsk, Poland. She served as an assistant attorney general in the Office of the Attorney General for the District of Columbia. Matini has also served as senior legal fellow for the Einstein Institute for Science, Health and the Courts.

In February 2018, Matini was nominated by President Donald Trump to a 15-year term as an associate judge on the Superior Court of the District of Columbia. She was confirmed by the U.S. Senate on August 1, 2019. Her official investiture ceremony took place on January 10, 2020.
