= Christopher C. Joyner =

American legal scholar (1948 – 2011)

Christopher Clayton Joyner (May 16, 1948 – September 10, 2011) was a Professor of Government and Foreign Service at Georgetown University. With Anthony Clark Arend, he co-founded and directed the Institute for International Law and Politics.

Dr. Joyner had previously taught at George Washington University, the University of Virginia, Dartmouth College, and Muhlenberg College. He was also a senior research fellow at the Woods Hole Oceanographic Institution and the Institute for Antarctic and Southern Ocean Studies at the University of Tasmania, Australia. At Georgetown, he taught courses on international law, international organization, and global environmental regimes.

Recognized as one of the leading experts on international law and Antarctica, he authored numerous books, including International Law in the 21st Century: Rules for Global Governance, Governing the Frozen Commons: The Antarctic Regime and Environmental Protection, and The United Nations and International Law.

== Publications ==
- Joyner, Christopher C. (1981) "U.N. General Assembly Resolutions and International Law: Rethinking the Contemporary Dynamics of Norm-Creation," California Western International Law Journal: Vol. 11: No. 3, Article 11. Available at: https://scholarlycommons.law.cwsl.edu/cwilj/vol11/iss3/11
