= George R. Houston Jr. =

President of Mount St. Mary's University from 1994 to 2003

George R. Houston Jr. served as President of Mount St. Mary's University near Emmitsburg, Maryland from 1994 until 2003.

After graduating first in his class at the School of Business Administration at Georgetown University in 1961, he taught part-time at Georgetown as an adjunct lecturer in accounting. He accepted a full-time faculty position in 1966 and was a School of Business faculty member and administrator until 1994. He served as Georgetown's chief financial officer from 1970 to 1994 and managing director of Georgetown's Endowment Fund from 1990 to 1994

He retired from Mount St. Mary's in 2003, assuming the title of President Emeritus, and died from pancreatic cancer on January 19, 2008, at the age of 68.
