= McDonough School of Business =

Business school of Georgetown University

- Seal of Georgetown University
- Former names: School of Business Administration, School of Business
- Type: Private
- Established: 1957
- Parent institution: Georgetown University
- Affiliations: Roman Catholic (Jesuit)
- Dean: Paul Almeida
- Undergraduates: 1,354
- Postgraduates: 979
- Location: Washington, D.C., U.S. 38°54′32.8″N 77°4′31.9″W
- Website: msb.georgetown.edu

The Robert Emmett McDonough School of Business, commonly shorted to the McDonough School of Business and abbreviated as the MSB, is the business school of Georgetown University in Washington, D.C. Founded in 1957, it grants both undergraduate and graduate degrees, and is one of the university's nine constituent schools. Since 1998, the school has been named in honor of Georgetown alumnus Robert Emmett McDonough.

== History ==
The school was founded in 1957 as an outgrowth of the School of Foreign Service, and was originally named the Georgetown University School of Business Administration. In 1993, the name was changed to the Georgetown University School of Business. On October 7, 1998, the School of Business was renamed the Robert Emmett McDonough School of Business in honor of alumnus Robert Emmett McDonough (a 1949 graduate of the School of Foreign Service) in honor of his $30 million donation to the school.

=== Key Dates ===
Founding dates for academic programs:

- Undergraduate Program (B.S. in Business Administration): 1957
- Full-time MBA Program: 1981
- Executive Education: 1988
- Executive MBA: 1994
- Flex MBA: 2005
- Executive Master's in Leadership: 2005
- M.S. in Finance: 2014
- M.A. in International Business and Policy: 2017
- M.S. in management (MiM): 2019
- B.S. in Business and Global Affairs (BGA): 2020
- M.S. in Business Analytics: 2021
- M.S. in Environment & Sustainability Management: 2022
- B.S. in International Business, Language, and Culture (IBLC): 2023
- M.S. in Global Real Assets: 2023
- Executive MBA Dubai: 2023

Founding dates for faculty-led centers, initiatives, and institutes:

- Center for Business and Public Policy: 2002
- Georgetown Women's Leadership Institute: 2003
- Georgetown Entrepreneurship: 2009
- Center for Financial Markets and Policy: 2010
- Steers Center for Global Real Estate: 2010
- Business for Impact: 2011
- Georgetown Institute for Consumer Research: 2012
- Georgetown Institute for the Study of Markets and Ethics: 2012
- Global Business Initiative: 2012

=== The Rafik B. Hariri Building ===
In 2009, the McDonough School of Business moved into the newly constructed Rafik B. Hariri Building, named after the late Rafik Hariri, former Prime Minister of Lebanon and father of Georgetown alumnus Saad Hariri, also a former Prime Minister of Lebanon. The $82.5-million privately funded building opened in the summer of 2009 and is LEED Silver certified. The new building includes 15 classrooms, eight case-style rooms, five tiered lecture rooms, and two flat-floor rooms; 34 breakout rooms complete with data ports, flat-screen video monitors, and white boards; separate undergraduate and graduate commons areas and lockers for graduate students; 120 faculty offices; 11 interview rooms within the Career Management Office; 15 conference rooms throughout the building; and a 400-seat auditorium, among other features.

== Academics ==
Business school rankings

U.S. MBA Rankings
- Bloomberg (2025): 24
- U.S. News & World Report (2025): 22

Global MBA Rankings
- FT (2026): 27

Several academic themes distinguish the McDonough School of Business and give the school a special identity among managers and academicians, including international and intercultural dimensions of the marketplace, the importance of written and oral communication, and interpersonal effectiveness in organizations. As a Catholic and Jesuit university, Georgetown stresses ethics and social justice in its curriculum.

The Georgetown Institute for Consumer Research is one of several academic research centers at the McDonough School of Business.

The McDonough School of Business is accredited by the Association to Advance Collegiate Schools of Business.

== Undergraduate school ==
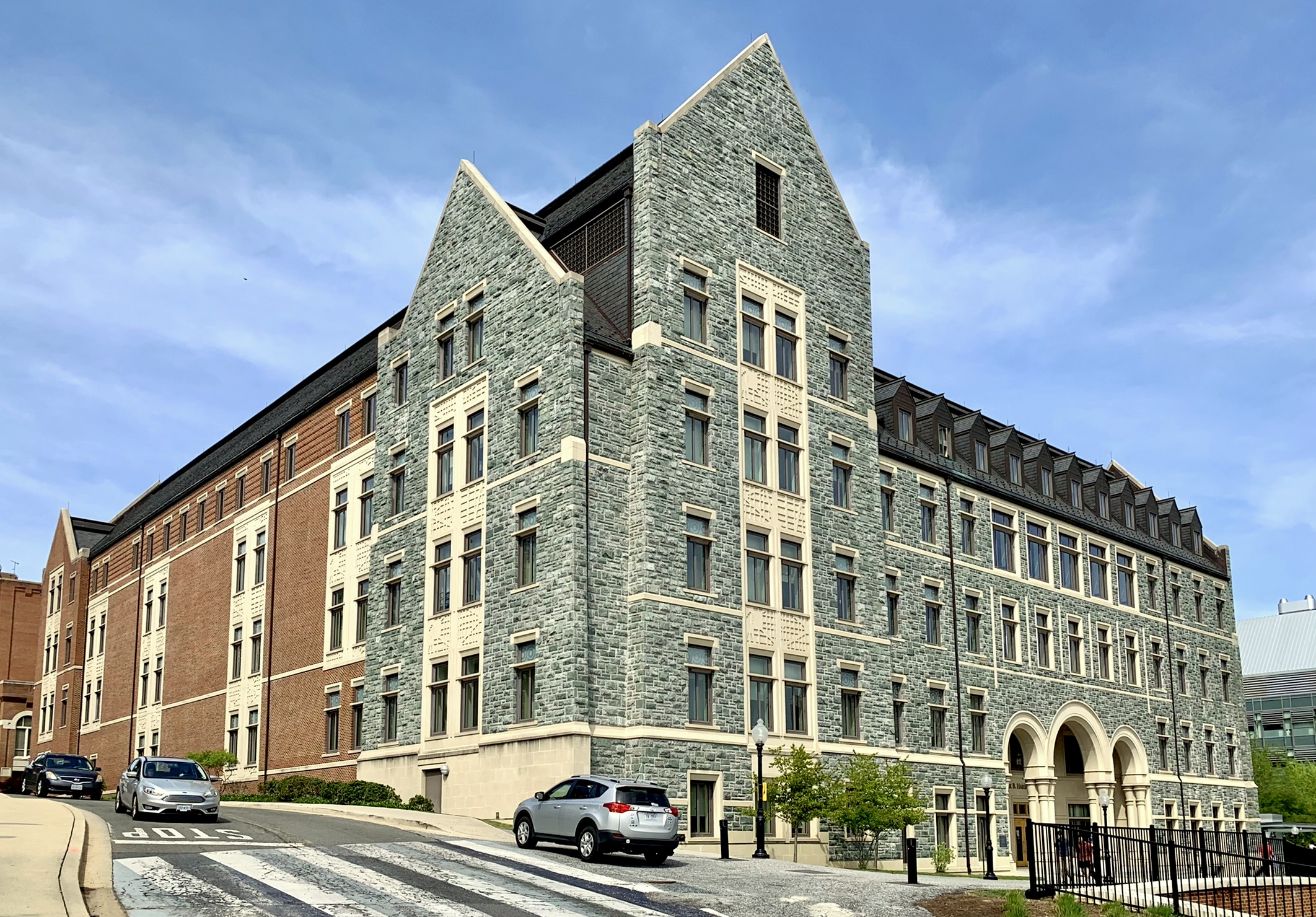
The Rafik B. Hariri Building opened in 2009.

Undergraduates work toward a Bachelor of Science in Business Administration (BSBA). The curriculum combines business and liberal arts courses. The primary academic emphasis during the first and second years is the liberal arts, including economics, government, history, philosophy, English, calculus, and theology.

The McDonough School of Business has core courses in the traditional disciplines of accounting, finance, marketing, management, and the decision sciences support these themes. Additionally these themes are supported by the school's support of minor concentrations among nearly 50 liberal arts disciplines. Undergraduate concentrations include accounting, finance, international business, management, marketing, and operations and information management (OPIM). The school's undergraduate acceptance rate in the 2009–2010 cycle was 22 percent, but dropped to 15.7 percent for the 2014–2015 cycle, where the school accepted 530 applicants out of roughly 3,375 applicants.

=== Student groups, activities, and employment ===
The Undergraduate Program Office and active students provide dozens of activities and groups. Some activities include the Georgetown University Student Investment Fund, Georgetown University Accounting Society, Innovo Consulting, Hilltop Consultants, Alpha Kappa Psi Professional Business Fraternity, Young Alumni Mentor Program, Stock Pitch Competition, and other activities.

Students work for a variety of skill-based jobs on campus, such as in accounting or finance department of student groups and companies (such as The Corp, The Hoya, and the Georgetown University Alumni & Student Federal Credit Union), the University Investment Office, the MSB Tech Center, and University Information Services.

The school also offers six-week summer study-abroad programs tailored specifically for business students at the University of Oxford, Sophia University in Tokyo, and the ESADE Business School.

== Graduate school ==
Graduate work offered by the school includes Master of Business Administration (MBA) programs, two Global Executive MBA programs, a Master of Science in finance (MSF) program, a Master of Science in management and an Executive Master's in Leadership degree.

=== MBA program ===
Georgetown University's Full-time MBA is a global management program that provides a rigorous foundation in ethics and leadership for graduates of liberal arts, science or technical disciplines. A signature element of the program is the Global Business Experience consulting projects where students work with international companies to address real-world challenges facing the organizations.

For the class of 2019, 34% of enrolled students were international and 77% lived, worked, or studied abroad. There were 1,742 applicants and 276 were enrolled.

=== Master of Science in Finance ===
The Master of Science includes coursework in corporate finance, financial markets, econometrics, real estate private equity, big and small data, and fixed income investments, among others.

== List of deans ==
Deans and directors
No.	Name	Years	Notes	Ref.
Directors of the School of Business Administration
1	Henry M. Cunningham	1957–1960		
2	Raymond Pelissier	1960–1964		
Deans of the School of Business Administration
1	Joseph S. Sebes SJ	1964–1965	Acting dean	
2	Harry P. Guenther	1965–1969		
3	Eugene K. Snyder	1969–1972		
4	Edward M. Kaitz	1972–1976		
5	Joseph Pettit	1976–1977	Acting dean	
6	Ronald Smith	1977–1986		
7	Robert S. Parker	1986–1993		
Deans of the School of Business
-	Robert S. Parker	1993–1997		
Deans of the McDonough School of Business
8	Christopher Puto	1998–2002		
9	John Mayo	2002–2004		
10	Reena Aggarwal (academic)	2004–2005	Acting dean	
11	George G. Daly	2005–2011		
12	David A. Thomas	2011–2016		
13	Rohan Williamson	2016–2017	Acting dean	
14	Paul Almeida	2017–present		

== Alumni ==
Georgetown's McDonough School of Business claims more than 10,500 undergraduate alumni and approximately 5,000 MBA and Executive MBA alumni.

== See also ==
- List of United States business school rankings
- List of business schools in the United States
- Georgetown Institute for Consumer Research
