= Catherine Lotrionte =

Catherine Lotrionte (born December 19, 1968) is an American legal scholar and academic, who is currently the Director of the Institute for Law, Science and Global Security at Georgetown University. She also taught in the Master of Science in Foreign Service (MSFS) Program and Security Studies Program at Georgetown.

== Career ==
In 2002, Dr. Lotrionte was appointed by General Brent Scowcroft to be Counsel to the President's Foreign Intelligence Advisory Board at the White House, a position she held until 2006. In 2002, she served as Legal Counsel for the Joint Inquiry Committee of the Senate Select Committee on Intelligence. Prior to that, Dr. Lotrionte was Assistant General Counsel at the Central Intelligence Agency.

At Georgetown, Dr. Lotrionte also served as a visiting assistant professor in the Department of Government and the School of Foreign Service and teaches courses on intelligence law and international law. She is the author of numerous publications, including an article on killing regime leaders published in The Washington Quarterly, entitled, "When to Target Leaders". She is a life member of the Council on Foreign Relations. Dr. Lotrionte earned a B.A., summa cum laude, from the University of Massachusetts Amherst and a J.D. from New York University Law School. She has an M.A. in Security Studies and a Ph.D., with distinction, from Georgetown University.
