= Ibrahim Oweiss =

American economist (1931–2023)

- Oweiss in 2006
- Born: September 25, 1931
- Died: November 27, 2023 (aged 92); Bethesda, Maryland, U.S.
- Education: Alexandria University; University of Minnesota
- Occupation: Economist
- Spouse: Céline Oweiss
- Children: 2
- Website: http://faculty.georgetown.edu/imo3/

Ibrahim M. Oweiss (September 25, 1931 – November 27, 2023) was an Egyptian-American economist, international economic advisor, and professor of economics at Georgetown University in Washington, D.C.

== Biography ==
=== Early life and education ===
Oweiss received a Bachelor of Commerce degree from Alexandria University in Egypt, majoring in economics and political science, before moving to the United States to earn Masters and Ph.D. degrees in economics at the University of Minnesota.

=== Career ===
Oweiss joined the faculty of Georgetown University in 1967. While on leave from Georgetown, he was appointed to the cabinet of the Egyptian government as First Under-Secretary for Economic Affairs in 1977, and with rank of Ambassador, held the position of Chief of the Egyptian Economic Mission to the United States in New York.

Oweiss authored over 50 scholarly publications, including several books. In a pioneering work on oil revenues, he introduced a term now widely used in global economics and business: "petrodollars". The influential Oweiss Demand Curve was first presented at Oxford University. He has been a prominent faculty member who shaped generations of Georgetown students in economics, international affairs, and related fields, including US President Bill Clinton (Class of 1968), who wrote the preface to Oweiss's memoir in 2011. His academic interests have focused on international trade, especially free trade, and the economics of the Middle East. He has advocated for greater international cooperation and mutual understanding among countries. Oweiss is often noted by students for his humanistic, optimistic approach and his emphasis on maintaining values in the midst of scholarship and economic development. Oweiss was Associate Professor Emeritus in the Department of Economics and taught at the Georgetown University School of Foreign Service in Qatar.

Oweiss served as an economic advisor for several governments, multinational corporations, and individuals, in the United States and abroad. He was also an advisor to US President Jimmy Carter and business magnate Armand Hammer. Oweiss was President of the Council on Egyptian-American Relations and the Association of Egyptian American Scholars, and a founding member of the Center for Contemporary Arab Studies at Georgetown University as well as the College of Commerce and Economics at Sultan Qaboos University in Oman. In February 2009, Oweiss spoke on "The Global Depression and the Gulf Economies" at the Georgetown Qatar Campus.

In a 2005 article by Egypt's Al-Ahram Weekly, Oweiss stated that Egyptian expatriate scholars like himself "never let go of their ties with their home country." The article suggests this bond with his native Egypt was Oweiss's motivation for having "offered his services to the Egyptian government" to be "assigned by President Anwar El-Sadat as chief of the Egyptian economic mission to the US in 1977." In the article, Oweiss goes on to state, "I have always been involved in Egyptian affairs... I have twice presided over the Egyptian American Scholars Association and have overseen several projects that aimed at technology and knowledge transfer back to Egypt."

=== Death ===
Oweiss died in Bethesda, Maryland on November 27, 2023, at the age of 92.

== Selected publications ==
- Some Positive Aspects of the Egyptian Economy. Georgetown University. 1978.
- Petrodollar Surpluses: Trends and Economic Impact. Georgetown University. 1983.
- Arab Civilization: Challenges and Responses. State University of New York Press. 1988. ISBN 978-0887066993.
- The Political Economy of Contemporary Egypt. Georgetown University. 1990. ISBN 978-0932568212.
- "Economics of Petrodollars". The Economic Dimensions of Middle Eastern History. Darwin Press. 1990. ISBN 978-0878500703.
- A Tale of Two Cultures: A Personal Account. New Academia Publishing. 2011. ISBN 978-0983689911.

== Awards and honors ==
- Order of Merit (Egypt), First Class
- Grand Cordon of the Order of Mohammed Ali Pasha
- Knight of the Order of the Queen of Sheba
- Ibrahim Oweiss Lecture
