= Prostate evolution in monotreme mammals =

The monotremes (egg laying mammals) represent the order of extant mammals most distantly related to humans. The platypus (Ornithorhynchus anatinus) is indigenous to eastern Australia; the short-beaked echidna (Tachyglossus aculeatus) is indigenous to Australia and Papua New Guinea; whereas the long-beaked echidna (Zaglossus bruijni) is restricted to Papua New Guinea and Irian Jaya. Since monotremes exhibit characteristics common with both reptiles (e.g. presence of a cloaca) and therian mammals (e.g. mammary glands), they are of great interest for the study of mammalian evolution.

== Monotremes exhibit a combination of reptilian and mammalian characteristics ==
Male monotremes are testicond (have intraabdominal testes) with the testes undergoing seasonal emergence during winter. The fully developed seminiferous tubules exhibit distinctly small stages of spermatogenesis in that more than one stage is often observed in a cross section of the tubule, a characteristic of spermatogenesis that has also been observed in a reptile, common in birds and man.

The monotreme paired excurrent ducts (ductuli efferentes, epididymides and vasa deferentia) empty into a single urethra. Glandular tissue surrounds the urethra into which a pair of bulbourethral glands (Cowper's glands) empty at the base of the penis. The intraabdominal testes and excurrent ducts, along with the presence of a cloaca exhibit homology to the reptilian male reproductive tract.

The combination of reptilian and mammalian structures within the monotreme reproductive tract has informed the evolution of the male reproductive tract in mammals. For example, the intraabdominal low sperm storage capacity of the echidna epididymis informed the role of the epididymis as a prime mover in the evolution of descended testes in mammals as it relates to lower extragonadal temperatures enhancing epididymal sperm storage in scrotal mammals.

The glandular designation of periurethral tissue within the monotreme male reproductive tract has been a matter of scientific discussion for approximately two centuries. Examination of the monotreme periurethral tissue has been limited by the availability of these protected and relatively rare mammals, hence, the long time line for scientific research of reproductive tissue between studies.

== Structure of the monotreme prostate ==
Figure 1. Aspermatogenic echidna prostate

Figure 2. Spermatogenic echidna prostate

The glandular tissue surrounding the monotreme urethra most likely represents a rudimentary prostate. There are no periurethral glands in reptiles. Hence, the evolution of the prostate gland is unique to mammals. Primordial periurethral glands have been described in the platypus as secretory glandular tissue surrounding the length of the urethra. The periurethral tissue exhibits regional swelling, being widest immediately beneath the bladder and progressively reducing in thickness along the length of the urethra. Surrounding the periurethral glands is a urethral muscularis. Observations in the platypus of the periurethral glands were non-committal as to homology with the prostate. Subsequently, the periurethral tissue in the echidna was definitively identified as a rudimentary prostate. This is supported by:

1. anatomically these glands are placed at their widest at the base of the bladder, which is similar in location for the prostate in other mammals,
2. histologic lining of the echidna urethra with transitional epithelium (Figures 1 & 2), and not post-prostate urethral lining of pseudostratified or stratified columnar epithelium observed in eutherian mammals,
3. location of periurethral glands with 9-11 buds per cross section surrounding and exiting into the urethra,
4. histology of simple columnar secretory cells lining compound alveolar glands,
5. the glandular tissue is surrounded by a muscularis to facilitate expulsion of secretory products into the urethra,
6. seasonal changes in echidna glandular development, whereby in aspermatogenic animals the glandular tissue surrounding the urethra is less developed (Figure 1) than during the breeding season when the secretory glands surrounding the urethra of spermatogenic animals appear well developed (Figure 2) coinciding with elevated levels of testosterone and active spermatogenesis.

In aggregate, these characteristics of glandular tissue surrounding the urethra identify a rudimentary disseminate prostate in monotremes.
