= Kidney (vertebrates) =

Paired internal organ in vertebrates

The kidneys are a pair of organs of the excretory system in vertebrates, which maintain the balance of water and electrolytes in the body (osmoregulation), filter the blood, remove metabolic waste products, and, in many vertebrates, also produce hormones (in particular, renin) and maintain blood pressure. In healthy vertebrates, the kidneys maintain homeostasis of extracellular fluid in the body. When the blood is being filtered, the kidneys form urine, which consists of water and excess or unnecessary substances. The urine is then excreted from the body through other organs, which in vertebrates, depending on the species, may include the ureter, urinary bladder, cloaca, and urethra.

All vertebrates have kidneys. The kidneys are the main organ that allows species to adapt to different environments, including fresh and salt water, terrestrial life and desert climate. Depending on the environment in which animals have evolved, the functions and structure of the kidneys may differ. Also, between classes of animals, the kidneys differ in shape and anatomical location. In mammals, they are usually bean-shaped. Evolutionarily, the kidneys first appeared in fish as a result of the independent evolution of the renal glomeruli and tubules, which eventually united into a single functional unit. In some invertebrates, the nephridia are analogous to the kidneys but nephridia are not kidneys. The metanephridia, together with the vascular filtration site and coelom, are functionally identical to the ancestral primitive kidneys of vertebrates.

The main structural and functional element of the kidney is the nephron. Between animals, the kidneys can differ in the number of nephrons and in their organisation. According to the complexity of the organisation of the nephron, the kidneys are divided into pronephros, mesonephros and metanephros. The nephron by itself is similar to pronephros as a whole organ. The simplest nephrons are found in the pronephros, which is the final functional organ in primitive fish. The nephrons of the mesonephros, the functional organ in most anamniotes called opisthonephros, are slightly more complex than those of the pronephros. The main difference between the pronephros and the mesonephros is that the pronephros consists of non-integrated nephrons with external glomeruli. The most complex nephrons are found in the metanephros of birds and mammals. The kidneys of birds and mammals have nephrons with loop of Henle.

All three types of kidneys are developed from the intermediate mesoderm of the embryo. It is believed that the development of embryonic kidneys reflects the evolution of vertebrate kidneys from an early primitive kidney, the archinephros. In some vertebrate species, the pronephros and mesonephros are functional organs, while in others they are only intermediate stages in the development of the final kidney, and each next kidney replaces the previous one. The pronephros is a functioning kidney of the embryo in bony fish and amphibian larvae, but in mammals it is most often considered rudimentary and not functional. In some lungfish and bony fishes, the pronephros can remain functional in adults, including often simultaneously with the mesonephros. The mesonephros is the final kidney in amphibians and most fish.

== Evolution ==
Evolutionary pressure and the need to regulate body fluid homeostasis have led to pre-adaptation of the vertebrate kidneys to different environment conditions and to development of three kidney forms: the pronephros, mesonephros and metanephros. The kidneys of amniotes are unique compared to other internal organs, since three different kidneys are sequentially developed during embryogenesis, replacing each other and reflecting the evolution of the kidneys in vertebrates.

At the very beginning of vertebrates, when they evolved from marine chordates, their evolution probably took place in fresh or slightly saline water. There is a hypothesis according to which marine fish received their kidneys after a previous adaptation of the kidneys to fresh water. As a result, early vertebrates developed renal glomeruli capable of filtering blood and perhaps tubules that reabsorbed ions. Excretion of excess water from the body is the main characteristic of the pronephros in the case of species in which it develops into a functional excretory organ. In some species, the pronephros is functional during the embryonic stage of development, representing the first stage of kidney development, after which the mesonephros develops. The mesonephros probably appeared in the course of evolution in response to the increase in body mass of vertebrates, which also led to an increase in blood pressure.

The evolution of the kidneys, along with the evolution of the lungs, allowed vertebrates called amniotes to live and reproduce in terrestrial environment. Metanephros, the permanent kidney of amniotes, has the unique ability to efficiently retain water in the body. In addition to water conservation, terrestrial life also required maintenance of salt levels in the body along with the excretion of waste products. The first class of animals to become fully terrestrial without a larval stage were the reptiles, which were the first amniotes. The kidney takes a key role in maintenance of the constant internal environment. The relative ionic composition of the extracellular fluid is similar between marine fish and all subsequent species. Therefore, it can be said that the kidneys made it possible to preserve approximately the same composition of extracellular fluid in vertebrates as it was in the primordial ocean.

== Kidney forms ==
=== Archinephros ===
It is believed that the ancient primitive form of the kidney was the archinephros, which had series of segmental tubules through the entire length of the trunk part of the body, and each body segment had a pair of tubules. All tubules were opened medially (closer to the midline of the body) into the body cavity known as coelom and united laterally into the two common archinephric ducts which were located in opposite sides of the body. And the archinephric ducts were opened into the cloaca. As an organ, the archnephros is still preserved in the larvae of hagfishes and some caecilians, and is also found in the embryos of some more developed vertebrates.

=== Pronephros ===
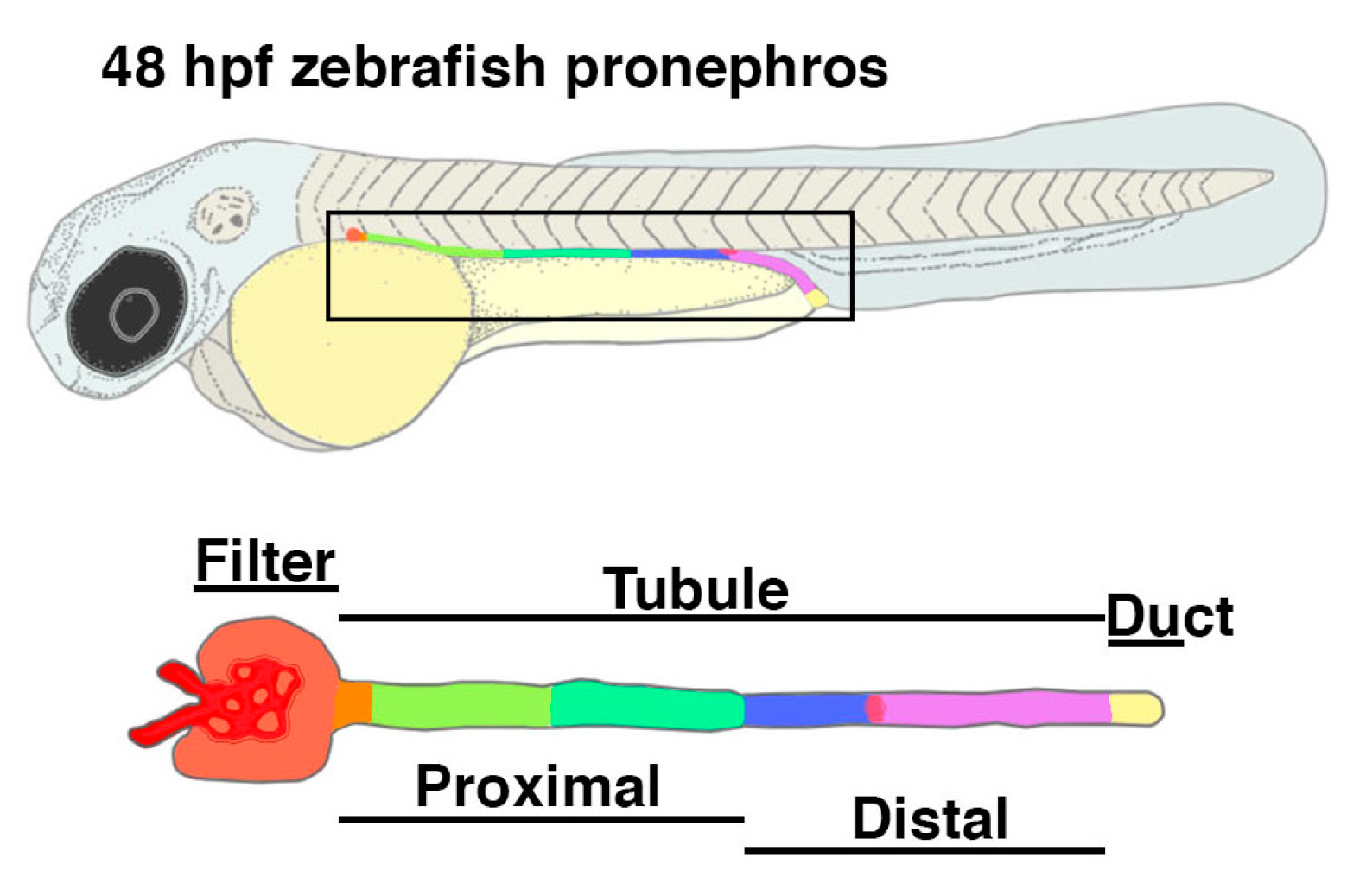
Zebrafish pronephros

In lower vertebrates, the pronephros is sometimes called the head kidney due to its anterior position behind the head. In embryogenesis it is usually a transitional structure and is subsequently replaced by the mesonephros in most vertebrates. In mammalian embryogenesis, the pronephros is usually considered to be rudimentary and non-functional. A functional pronephros develops in vertebrates that have a free-swimming larval stage in their development.

Pronephros functions in amphibians in the larval stage, in the adults of some bony fishes, and in the adults of some other fish species. The pronephros is a vital organ in animals that go through the aquatic larval stage. If in larvae the pronephros becomes non-functional, then they rapidly die from edema.

The pronephros is a relatively large organ that has a primitive structure and usually consists of a single pair of bilateral nephrons with an external glomerulus or glomus. The typical pronephric nephron is non-integrated, and the wastes are filtered through the glomerulus or glomus directly to the coelom, in the more advanced pronephros they are filtered into the nephrocoel, which is a cavity adjacent to the coelom. The coelom is connected to the pronephric duct through the ciliated nephrostomes, which drain coelom fluid into the cloaca.

Because of its small size and simple structure, the pronephros of fish and amphibian larvae has become an important experimental model for studying kidney development.

=== Mesonephros and opisthonephros ===
Mesonephros develops after the pronephros, replacing it. The mesonephros is the final kidney in amphibians and most fish. In more advanced vertebrates (amniotes), mesonephros develops during embryogenesis and is then replaced by the metanephros. In reptiles and marsupials, it remains functional for some time after birth along with the metanephros. When mesonephros degenerates in male mammals, its remains are involved in the formation of the reproductive system. Sometimes the anamniote mesonephros is called opistonephros to distinguish it from the stage of development in amniotes. In anamniotes, opisthonephros develops from a region of the nephric ridge, which is derived from intermediate mesoderm, from which both the mesonephros and metanephros are developed in the embryo of amniotes.

Unlike the pronephros, the mesonephros consists of a set of nephrons, the glomeruli of which are enclosed in Bowman's capsules, but in some marine fish glomeruli may be absent. In fish, mesonephric kidneys has no division into cortex and medulla. Usually the mesonephros consists of 10–50 nephrons. The mesonephric tubules may have a connection to the coelom, however, the glomeruli of mesonephric nephrons still remain integrated. Nephrostomes are typically absent in the embryonic mesonephros of birds and mammals. Mesonephros in fish has the ability to add new nephrons while body mass increases.

=== Metanephros ===
In amniotes, which include reptiles, birds, and mammals, the pronephros and mesonephros are usually intermediate stages in the formation of metanephros during embryonic development, and metanephros is the final kidney. Genes that are involved in the formation of one form of kidney are reused in the formation of the next one. Metanephros differs from pronephros and mesonephros in development, position in the body, shape, number of nephrons, organization and drainage. Unlike mesonephros, after the end of its development process, metanephros has no longer the ability to add new nephrons through nephrogenesis, although many reptiles show ongoing nephron formation in adults.

Metanephros is the most complex form of kidney. Each metanephric kidney is characterized by a large number of nephrons and a highly branched system of collecting tubules and ducts, that open into the ureter. Such branching in the metanephros is unique in relation to the pronephros and mesonephros. Depending on classes and species urine from the ureters can be excreted directly into the cloaca, or collected in the urinary bladder and then excreted into the cloaca, or collected in the urinary bladder and then excreted outside through the urethra.

== Metanephric kidneys ==
=== Reptile kidney ===
Reptiles were the first class of animals that had no larval stage and that were fully terrestrial animals. The mesonephros in reptiles functions for some time after birth simultaneously with the metanephros, while later the metanephric kidneys become permanent and the mesonephros degenerates.

The kidneys in reptiles are located mainly in the caudal part (away from the head) of the abdominal cavity or retroperitoneally (behind the peritoneum) in the pelvic cavity in the case of lizards. Reptile kidneys are commonly elongated with color ranging from light to dark brown. The shape of the kidneys varies between reptiles due to variations of their body form. The kidneys of snakes are elongated, cylindrical and lobulated. Turtles and some lizards have urinary bladder that opens into the cloaca but snakes and crocodiles do not have it.

Compared with the metanephros of birds and mammals, the metanephros of reptiles is simpler in structure. Unlike mammals, the kidneys of reptiles do not have a clear distinction between cortex and medulla. The kidneys lack the loop of Henle, have fewer nephrons (from about 3,000 to 30,000), and cannot produce hypertonic urine. Nitrogenous waste products excreted by the kidneys may include uric acid, urea and ammonia. Aquatic reptiles excrete predominantly urea, while terrestrial reptiles excrete uric acid, which allows them to conserve water.

Since the reptile kidneys are unable to produce concentrated urine due to the absence of the loop of Henle, glomerular filtration rate is decreased if water loss needs to be reduced. The glomeruli in reptiles have also decreased in size compared to amphibians. In addition to the renal artery blood supply, reptiles also have a renal portal system, which can redirect blood to the kidneys during periods of water deprivation, bypassing the glomeruli, to prevent ischemic necrosis of tubular cells.

=== Mammalian kidney ===
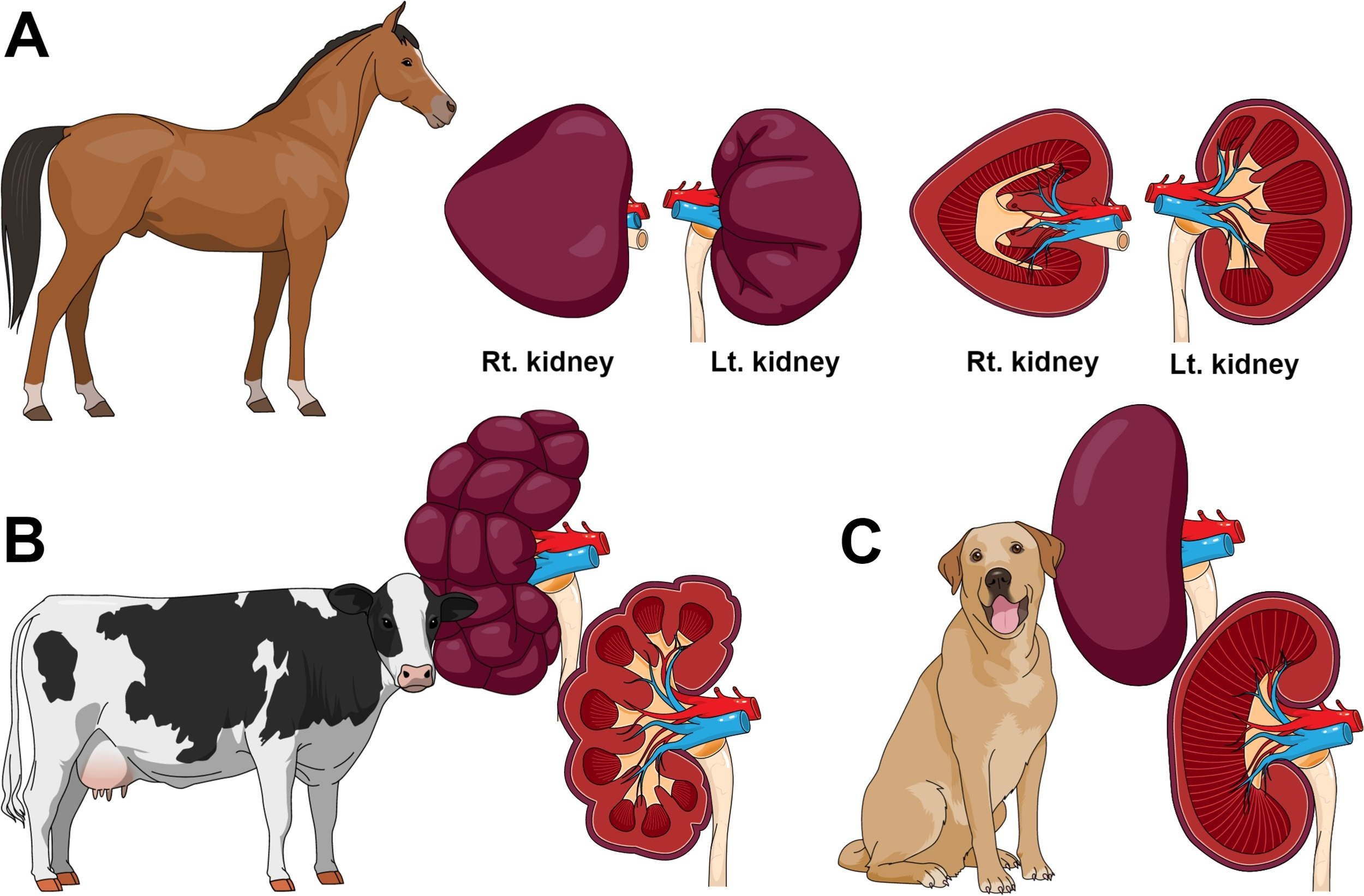
Equine, bovine, and canine kidneys

In mammals, the kidneys are usually bean-shaped and located retroperitoneally on the dorsal (posterior) wall of the body. The outer layer of each kidney is made up of a fibrous sheath called the renal capsule. The peripheral layer of the kidney is called the cortex and the inner part is called the medulla. The medulla consists of one or more pyramids, the bases of which start from corticomedullary border. Medulla pyramid with overlying cortex comprises the renal lobe. In multilobar kidneys, the pyramids are separated from each other by areas of cortical tissue that dip into the medulla, known as renal columns. Blood enters the kidney through the renal artery, which in the multilobar kidney then branches in the region of the renal pelvis into large interlobar arteries that pass through the renal columns. The pyramids consist mainly of tubules that transport urine from the cortex, that produces it by blood filtration, to the tips of the pyramids, that form the renal papillae. Urine is excreted through the renal papillae into the calyces and then into the pelvis, ureter, and bladder. Then it is excreted outside through the urethra. In monotremes, the ureters open into the urogenital sinus, which is connected to the urinary bladder and cloaca, and urine is excreted into the cloaca instead of the urethra.

Structurally, kidneys vary between mammals. Which structural type a particular species will have depends mainly on the body mass of the species. Small mammals have simple, unilobar kidneys with a compact structure and a single renal papilla, while large animals have more complex multilobar kidneys, such as those of bovines. Kidneys can also be with a single renal papilla (the unipapillary kidneys), as in mice and rats, with several, as in spider monkeys, or with a large number, as in pigs or humans. Most animals have a single renal papilla. In some animals, such as horses, the apices of the renal pyramids fuse with each other to form a common renal papilla, called the renal crest. The renal crest usually appears in animals larger than rabbits. The kidneys of bovines are multilobar with external lobation. Marine mammals, bears and otters have reniculate kidneys which are made of large amount of lobes called reniculi. Each reniculus can be compared to a simple unipapillary kidney as a whole.

Nitrogenous waste products are excreted by the kidneys of mammals primarily in the form of urea, which is highly soluble in water. Each nephron is located in both the cortex and the medulla. The most proximal part of the nephron is glomerulus, which is located in the cortex. The nephrons of the mammalian kidneys have loops of Henle, which are the most efficient way to reabsorb water and produce concentrated urine to conserve water in the body. The mammalian kidneys combine both nephrons with a short and nephrons with a long loop of Henle. The medulla is divided into outer and inner regions. The outer region consists of short loops of Henle and collecting ducts, and the inner region consists of long loops of Henle and collecting ducts. After passing through the loop of Henle, the fluid becomes hypertonic relative to the blood plasma. The renal portal system is absent in mammals.

=== Avian kidney ===
In birds, the kidneys are typically elongated and located dorsally in the abdominal cavity in the pelvic skeletal depressions.

The structure of the avian kidneys differs from the structure of the mammalian kidneys. The avian kidney is lobulated and usually consists of three lobes. The lobes are divided into lobules, each of which has a cortex and a medulla. The medulla of the each lobule is shaped like a cone, and, unlike mammals, it is not subdivided into the inner and outer regions, while structurally it is similar to the outer medulla of the mammalian kidney. In the avian kidney, the renal pelvis is absent, and each lobule has a separate branch to the ureter. No birds, except for the ostrich, have a bladder; urine is excreted from the kidneys through the ureters to the cloaca.

Avian kidneys combine so called reptilian-type nephrons, without the loop of Henle, and mammalian-type nephrons, with the loop of Henle. Most nephrons are reptilian-type. The loop of Henle of birds is similar to that of mammals, the main difference is that the nephron of birds has only a short loop of Henle. Like mammals, although to a lesser extent, birds are able to produce concentrated urine, thus conserving water in the body. Nitrogenous waste products are excreted mainly in the form of uric acid, which is a white paste that is poorly soluble in water, which also helps to reduce water loss. Additional water reabsorption occurs in the cloaca and distal intestine. Altogether, this allows birds to excrete their wastes without significant loss of water, allowing them to fly long distances with limited water.

In birds, the arterial blood is supplied to the kidneys by the cranial, middle and caudal renal arteries. Like reptiles, birds have a renal portal system, but it does not deliver blood to the loops of Henle, blood is delivered only to the proximal and distal tubules of the nephrons. When birds are in a state of dehydration, nephrons without a loop of Henle stop filtering, while nephrons with a loop continue, but due to the presence of a loop, they can produce concentrated urine.
