= Opisthonephros =

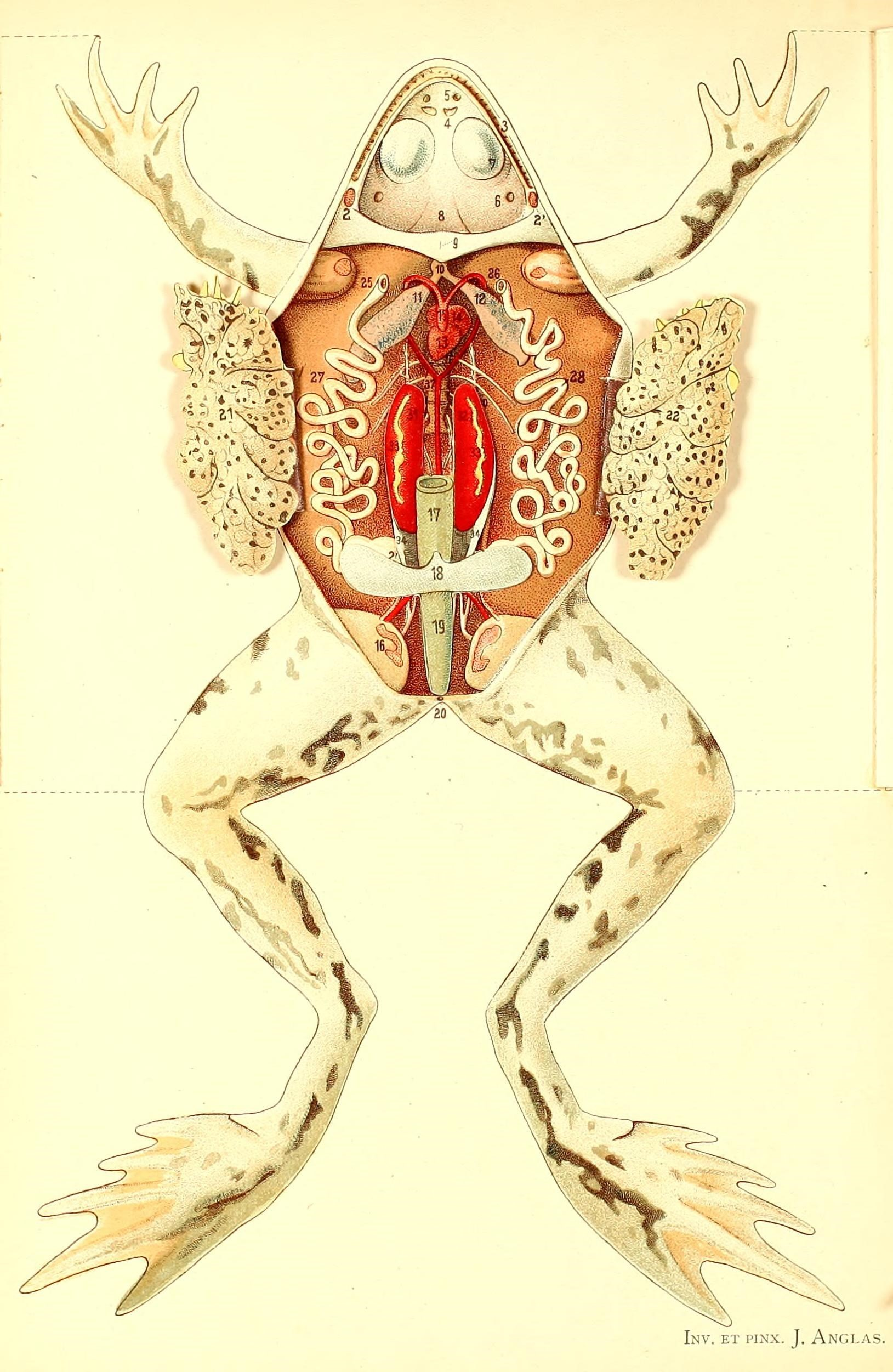
The kidney of the frog is an opisthonephros. The kidneys are seen as two elongated, red organs in this image.

The opisthonephros is the functional adult kidney in lampreys (cyclostomes), most fishes, and amphibians. It is formed from the extended mesonephros along with tubules from the posterior nephric ridge.

Kerr coined the term ‘opisthonephros’ in 1919. In 1949, Hyman wrote the opisthonephros “has used up the mesomere tissue from which in amniotes both mesonephros and metanephros come.” Some accounts call opisthonephros the ‘mesonephros’, but the opisthonephros in anamniotes (lampreys, fish, and amphibians) differ considerably than the mesonephros in amniotes (reptiles, birds, and mammals). Thus, the term mesonephros is usually reserved for the embryonic kidney of amniotes.

The mesonephros and metanephros of amniotes are derived from different parts of the anamniote opisthonephros. The metanephros is derived from the posterior part of the opisthonephros. In amniotes, most of the former opisthonephros became the epididymis, and the archinephric duct became the vas deferens.

== See also ==
- Pronephros
- Mesonephros
- Metanephros
