= Excretion =

Elimination of metabolic waste products by an organism

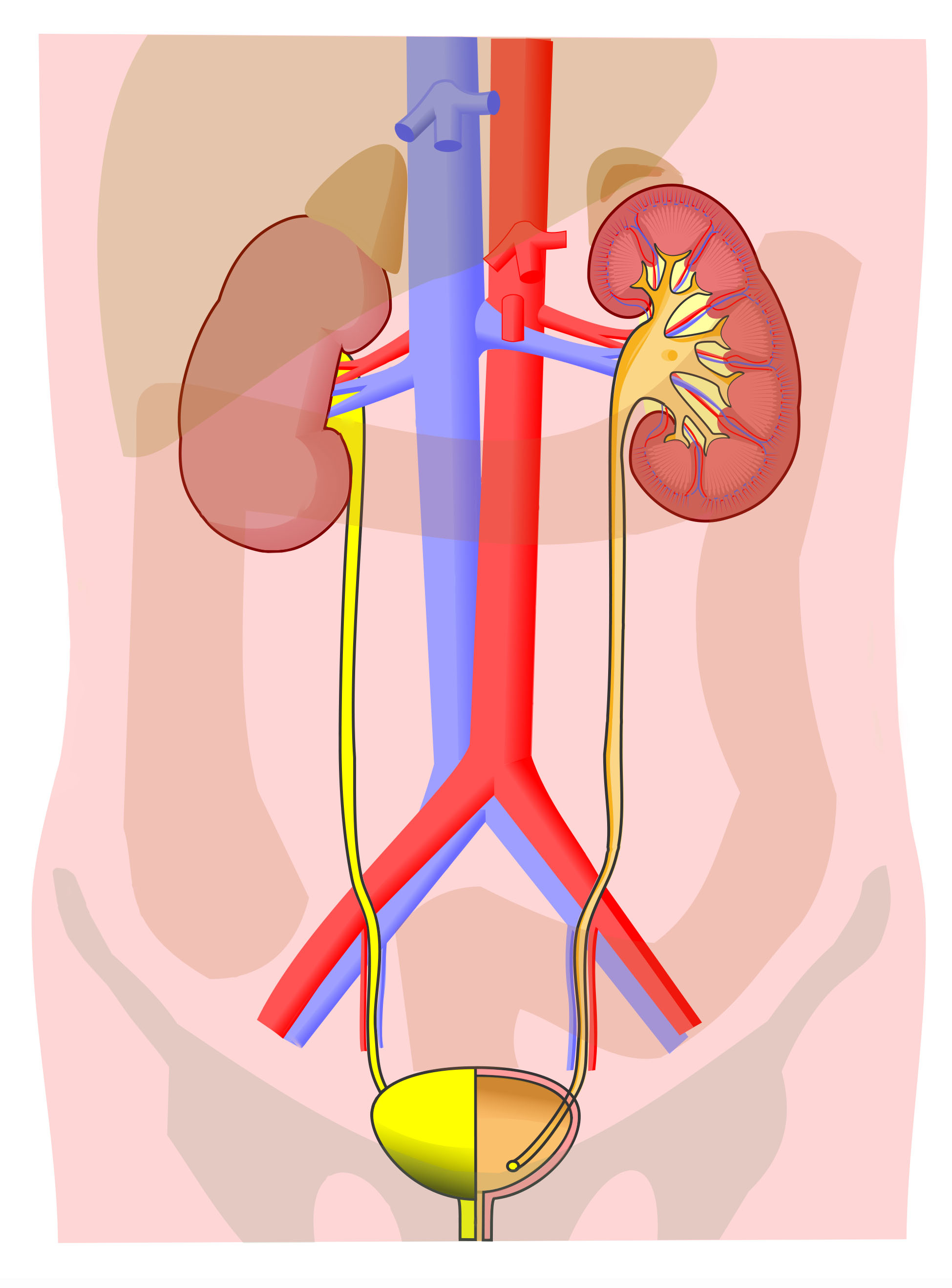
Mammals excrete urine through the urinary system.

Excretion is elimination of metabolic waste, which is an essential process in all organisms. In vertebrates, this is primarily carried out by the lungs, kidneys, and skin. This is in contrast with secretion, where the substance may have specific tasks after leaving the cell. For example, placental mammals expel urine from the bladder through the urethra, which is part of the excretory system. Unicellular organisms discharge waste products directly through the surface of the cell. Another example would be how mammals release solid waste (feces) through the anus during defecation.

During activities such as cellular respiration, several chemical reactions take place in the body. These are known as metabolism. These chemical reactions produce waste products such as carbon dioxide, water, salts, urea and uric acid. Accumulation of these wastes beyond a level inside the body is harmful to the body. The excretory organs remove these wastes. This process of removal of metabolic waste from the body is known as excretion.

== Processes across various types of life ==
=== Plants ===
In green plants, oxygen is a byproduct generated during photosynthesis, and exits through stomata, root cell walls, and other routes. Other materials that are exuded by some plants — resin, saps, latex, are forced from the interior of the plant by hydrostatic pressures inside the plant and by absorptive forces of plant cells. These latter processes do not require added energy, as they act passively. During the pre-abscission phase, deciduous plants excrete by leaf-fall.

=== Animals ===
Chemical structure of uric acid.

In animals, the main excretory products are carbon dioxide, ammonia (in ammoniotelics), urea (in ureotelics), uric acid (in uricotelics), guanine (in Arachnida), and creatine. The liver and kidneys clear many substances from the blood (for example, in renal excretion), and the cleared substances are then excreted from the body in the urine and feces.

Aquatic animals usually excrete ammonia directly into the external environment, as this compound has high solubility and there is ample water available for dilution. In terrestrial animals, ammonia-like compounds are converted into other nitrogenous materials, i.e. urea, that are less harmful as there is less water in the environment and ammonia itself is toxic. This process is called detoxification.

==== Birds ====
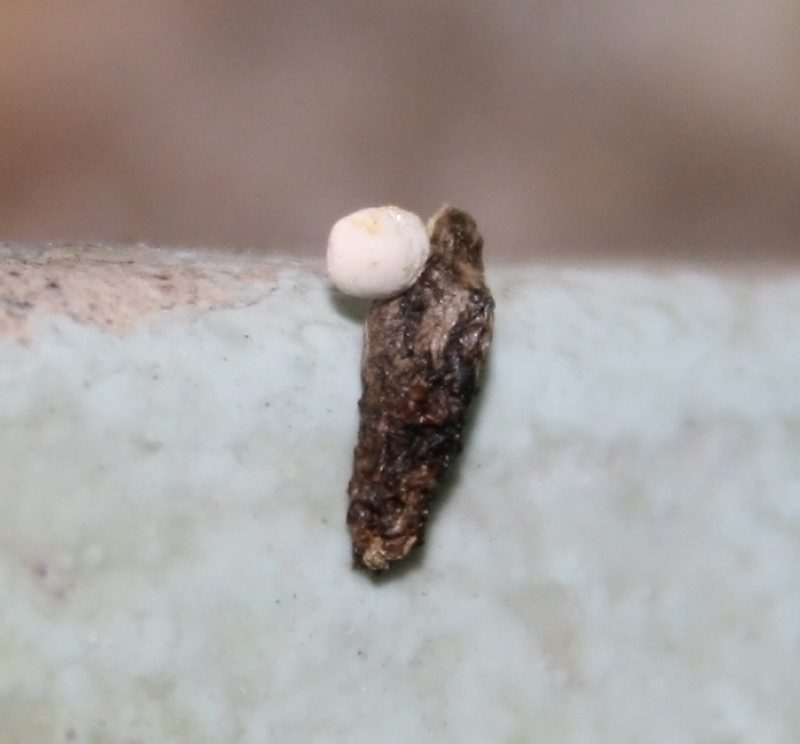
White cast of uric acid defecated along with the dark feces by a lizard. Insects, birds and some other reptiles also use a similar mechanism.

Birds excrete their nitrogenous wastes as uric acid in the form of a paste. Although this process is metabolically more expensive, it allows more efficient water retention and it can be stored more easily in the egg. Many avian species, especially seabirds, can also excrete salt via specialized nasal salt glands, the saline solution leaving through nostrils in the beak.

==== Insects ====
In insects, a system involving Malpighian tubules is used to excrete metabolic waste. Metabolic waste diffuses or is actively transported into the tubule, which transports the wastes to the intestines. The metabolic waste is then released from the body along with fecal matter.

The excreted material may be called ejecta. In pathology the word ejecta is more commonly used.

== In fiction ==
Excretion was traditionally a taboo subject in fiction and was rarely depicted explicitly, although later works have used it for satire, worldbuilding, horror and speculation about technology. The Encyclopedia of Science Fiction notes examples ranging from the reversed social taboos surrounding defecation in Brian Aldiss's The Dark Light Years (1964) to waste-recycling technologies in works such as Frank Herbert's Dune (1965), while spaceflight fiction has sometimes addressed the practical problems of sanitation and waste disposal. Depictions can also serve social or political purposes: Ursula K. Le Guin's "The Ones Who Walk Away from Omelas" (1973) associates excrement with the degradation of the abused child on whom its utopian society depends, while later works have employed toilets and excretion for comedy, horror and speculative depictions of future technology.

== See also ==
- Defecation
- Homeostasis
- Human excreta
- Osmoregulation
- Respiration (physiology)
- Sanitation
- Urination
