= Renal sinus =

Cavity within the kidney

Details
- System: Urinary system

Identifiers
- Latin: sinus renalis
- TA98: A08.1.01.005
- TA2: 3362
- FMA: 15611

The renal sinus is a cavity within the kidney which is occupied by the renal pelvis, renal calyces, blood vessels, nerves and fat. The renal hilum extends into a large cavity within the kidney occupied by the renal vessels, minor renal calyces, major renal calyces, renal pelvis and some adipose tissue.

== Additional images ==
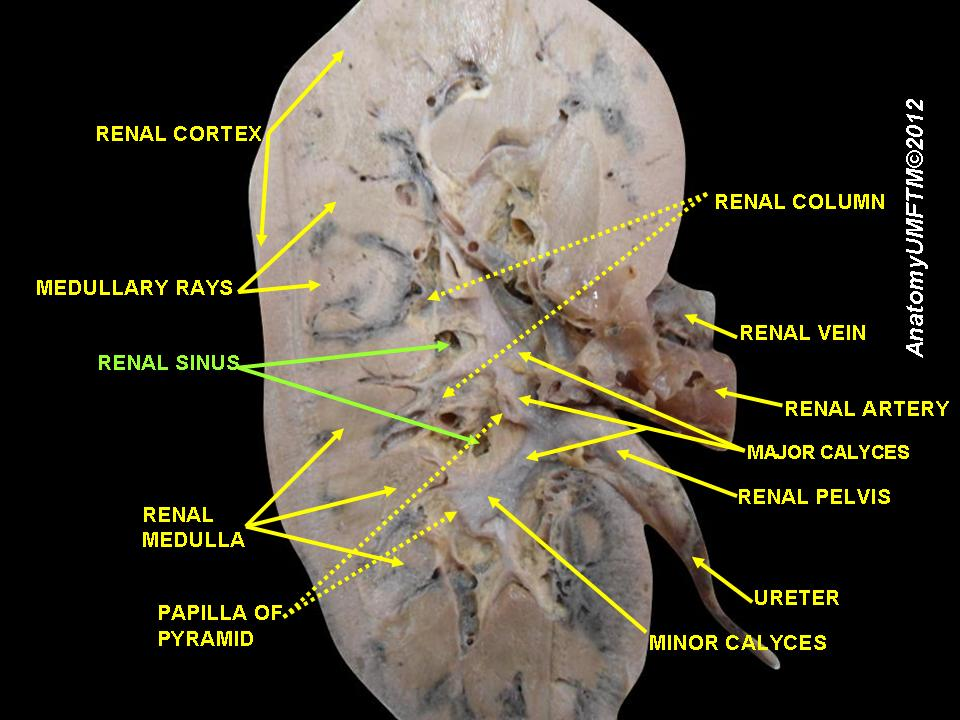
Renal sinus

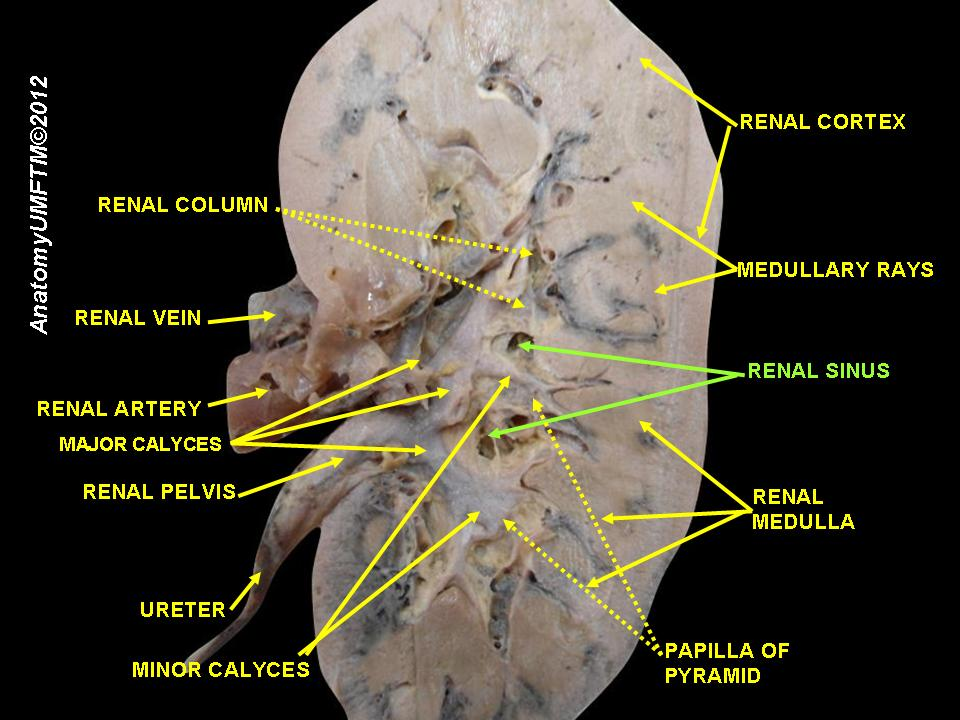
Renal sinus
