= Archinephros =

Hypothetical primitive kidney of ancestral vertebrates

The archinephros, or holonephros, is a primitive kidney that has been retained by the larvae of hagfish and some caecilians. A recent author has referred to this structure as "the hypothetical primitive kidney of ancestral vertebrates". In the earliest vertebrates, this structure potentially extended the entire length of the body and consisted of paired segmental structures which drained via a pair of archinephrenic ducts into the cloaca. The entire structure arises from the nephric ridge, which in humans embryos gives rise to nephrotomes and the pronephroi at around 4 weeks gestation. The pronephroi are supplanted by mesonephroi and finally by definitive kidneys, the metanephroi, by around 5 weeks gestation. The archinephros is nonfunctional in humans and other mammals.

The three types of mature vertebrate kidneys develop from the archinephros: the pronephros from the front section, the mesonephros from the mid-section and the metanephros from the rear section.
