= Nephrotome =

Details
- Days: 21
- Precursor: Mesoderm
- Gives rise to: Pronephros

Identifiers
- Latin: nephrotomus
- TE: E5.6.1.0.0.0.2

In earlier conceptions of kidney biology, the nephrotome was a section of the mesoderm that gives rise to the pronephros and eventually to the rest of the kidney. Older texts describe the pronephros as forming through the fusion of multiple nephrotomes.

Modern visualization methods, such as scanning electron microscopy, in situ hybridization, and confocal microscopy, combined with the simple approach of peeling off the epidermis to see the forming kidney, have shown that this is not the case. Nephric mesenchyme separates from the intermediate mesoderm as a single elongated primordia. As this primordia begins to undergo epithelialization the anterior portions of the pronephros form rounded protrusions, which then later became the dorsal branches of the pronephros that link to nephrostomes (distinct from nephrotomes). These rounded bumps are the structures observed in histological sections that are referred to as nephrotomes. Nephrotomes are not related to nephrostomes, which are thin ciliated funnels that link pronephric nephrons to the coelom.
