= Intermediate mesoderm =

Layer of cells in mammalian embryos

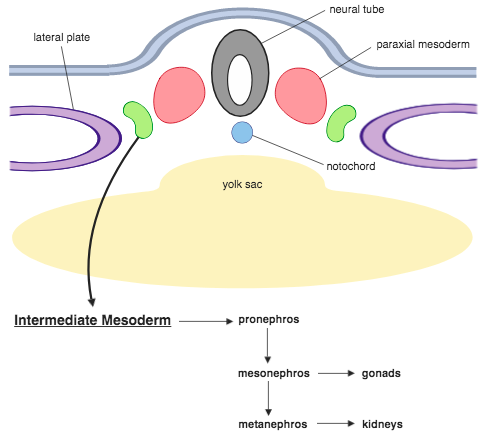
- Intermediate mesoderm location during early gastrulation and outline of organ derivatives in relation to mammals.: neural tube: grey.; Paraxial mesoderm: pink, at.; Intermediate mesoderm: green.; Lateral plate mesoderm: purple.; notochord: blue.; yolk sac: yellow.

Details
- Gives rise to: Kidneys, gonads

Identifiers
- Latin: mesenchyma intermedium
- TE: mesoderm_by_E5.6.0.0.0.0.2 E5.6.0.0.0.0.2

The intermediate mesoderm or intermediate mesenchyme is a narrow section of the mesoderm (the middle germ layer) located between the paraxial mesoderm and the lateral plate mesoderm of the developing embryo. The intermediate mesoderm develops into vital parts of the urogenital system (kidneys, gonads and respective tracts).

== Early formation ==
Factors regulating the formation of the intermediate mesoderm are not fully understood. It is believed that bone morphogenic proteins, or BMPs, specify regions of growth along the dorsoventral axis of the mesoderm and plays a central role in formation of the intermediate mesoderm. Vg1/Nodal signalling is an identified regulator of intermediate mesoderm formation acting through BMP signalling. Excess Vg1/Nodal signalling during early gastrulation stages results in expansion of the intermediate mesoderm at the expense of the adjacent paraxial mesoderm, whereas inhibition of Vg1/Nodal signalling represses intermediate mesoderm formation. A link has been established between Vg1/Nodal signalling and BMP signalling, whereby Vg1/Nodal signalling regulates intermediate mesoderm formation by modulating the growth-inducing effects of BMP signalling.

Other necessary markers of intermediate mesoderm induction include the odd-skipped related gene (Osr1) and paired-box-2 gene (Pax2) which require intermediate levels of BMP signalling to activate Markers of early intermediate mesoderm formation are often not exclusive to the intermediate mesoderm. This can be seen in early stages of intermediate mesoderm differentiation where higher levels of BMP stimulate growth of lateral plate tissue, whilst lower concentrations lead to paraxial mesoderm and somite formation. Osr1, which encodes a zinc-finger DNA-binding protein, and LIM-type homeobox gene (Lhx1) expression overlaps the intermediate mesoderm as well as the lateral plate. Osr1 has expression domains encompassing the entire length of the anterior-posterior (AP) axis from the first somites. It is not until the 4th-8th somite stage that markers with greater specificity to the intermediate mesoderm are identified including Pax2/8 genes activated from the 6th somite (Bouchard, 2002). Lhx1 expression also becomes more restricted to the intermediate mesoderm. Genetic analyses in animal studies show that Lhx1, Osr1 and Pax2/8 signalling are all critical in specification of the intermediate mesoderm into its early derivatives.

== Derived organs and tissues ==
As development proceeds, the intermediate mesoderm differentiates sequentially along the anterior-posterior axis into three successive stages of the early mammalian and avian urogenital system, named pronephros, mesonephros and metanephros respectively (anamniote embryos form only a pronephros and mesonephros). The intermediate mesoderm will eventually develop into the kidney and parts of both male and female reproductive systems.

=== Kidneys ===
Early kidney structures include the pronephros and mesonephros, whose complexity, size and duration can vary greatly between vertebrate species. The adult kidney, also referred to as the metanephric kidney, forms at the posterior end of the intermediate mesoderm after the degeneration of previous, less complex kidney structures.

==== Pronephros ====
During early development (approximately day 22 in humans), the pronephric duct forms from the intermediate mesoderm, ventral to the anterior somites. The cells of the pronephric duct migrate caudally whilst inducing adjacent mesenchyme to form the tubules of the initial kidney-like structure called the pronephros. This process is regulated by Pax2/8 markers. The pronephros is active in adult forms of some primitive fish and acts as the primary excretory system in amphibious larvae and embryonic forms of more advanced fish. In mammals however, the pronephric tubules and the anterior portion of the pronephric duct degenerates in 3.5 weeks to be succeeded by the mesonephros, the embryonic kidney.

==== Mesonephros ====
The mesonephros is constituted of a set of new tubules formed from the lateral and ventral sides of the gonadal ridge joining the cloaca. The mesonephros functions between the 6th and 10th weeks of embryological life of mammals as a temporary kidney, but serves as the permanent excretory organ of aquatic vertebrates. By 8 weeks post-conception, the human mesonephros reaches maximum size and begins to regress, with complete regression occurring by week 16. Despite its transiency, the mesonephros is crucial for the development of structures such as the Wolffian duct (or mesonephric duct), which in turn gives rise to the ureteric bud of the metanephric kidney.

==== Metanephros ====
The permanent kidney of amniotes, the metanephros, develops during the 10th week in human embryos and is formed by the reciprocal interactions of the metanephrogenic blastema (or metaneophrogenic mesenchyme) and the ureteric bud. Gonadal derived neurotrophic factor (GDNF) secreted by the metanephrogenic blastema activates the receptor tyrosine kinase RET, via the co-receptor GFRα1 and triggers outgrowth of Ret positive cells from the nephric duct towards the GDNF signal, promoting ureteric bud outgrowth and invasion. Once the bud invades the metanephrogenic blastema, a permissive signal in the form of Wnt proteins is activated and stimulates the condensation of metanephric mesenchymal cells around the ureteric bud tips, beginning the polarisation of the blastema to generate the epithelial cells of parts of the nephron: the proximal tubules, loops of Henle and the distal convoluted tubules. The ureteric bud secretes FGF2 (fibroblast growth factor 2) and BMP7 (bone morphogenic protein 7) to prevent apoptosis in the kidney mesenchyme. Condensing mesenchyme then secretes paracrine factors that mediate branching of the ureteric bud to give rise to the ureter and collecting duct of the adult kidney.

== Related malformations and disorders ==
=== Wilm's tumor ===
Wilms' tumor (WT), also known as nephroblastoma, is an embryonic tumor originating from metanephric blastemal cells that are incapable of completing the mesenchymal-epithelial transition (MET), a crucial process during kidney differentiation involving the transition from a multipolar, spindle-shaped mesenchymal cell to a planar assembly of polarized epithelial cells. As a consequence, WTs have a triphasic histology composed of three morphogenically distinct cell types: undifferentiated blastemal cells, epithelial cells, and stromal cells. The Wnt/βcatenin signalling pathway is crucial for initiating MET, where specifically the WNT4 protein is required for induction of epithelial renal vesicles and the transition from mesenchymal to epithelial cells. WTs are often a result of a genetic deletions or inactivating mutations in WT1 (Wilms tumor 1), which subsequently inhibits Wnt/βcatenin signalling and prevents MET progression.

=== Persistent Müllerian duct syndrome ===
Persistent Müllerian duct syndrome (PMDS) is a congenital disorder of male sexual development and is a form of pseudohermaphroditism. Males with PMDS retain normal male reproductive organs and external genitalia, but also possess internal female reproductive organs such as the uterus and fallopian tubes. PMDS is primarily caused by a mutation in the anti-Müllerian hormone (AMH) gene (PMDS Type 1) or AMHR2 gene (PMDS Type 2). In PMDS Type 1, AMH is either not produced, produced in deficient quantities, defective, or secreted at the wrong critical time for male differentiation. PMDS Type 2 is a result of AMH receptor insensitivity to AMH molecules. In a smaller percentage of cases, the cause of PMDS is not fully understood but is related to complex malformations of the urogenital region and paramesonephric ducts during male gonadal development.
