= Pronephros =

Urinary organ, nonfunctional in mammals

Details
- Carnegie stage: 10
- Days: 20
- Precursor: Nephrotome
- Gives rise to: Mesonephros

Identifiers
- MeSH: D060910
- TE: E5.6.1.0.0.0.1
- FMA: 72170

Pronephros is the most basic of the three excretory organs that develop in vertebrates, corresponding to the first stage of kidney development. It is succeeded by the mesonephros, which in fish and amphibians remains as the adult kidney. In amniotes, the mesonephros is the embryonic kidney and a more complex metanephros acts as the adult kidney. Once a more advanced kidney forms, the previous version typically degenerates by apoptosis or becomes part of the male reproductive system.

The pronephros develops from the intermediate mesoderm, as do the later kidneys. It is a paired organ, consisting of a single giant nephron that processes blood filtrate produced from glomeruli or glomera- large embryonic glomeruli. The filtrate is deposited into the coelom. It then passes through thin ciliated tubules into the pronephric nephron where it is processed for solute recovery.

The organ is active in adult forms of some primitive fish, like lampreys or hagfish. It is present at the embryo of more advanced fish and at the larval stage of amphibians where it plays an essential role in osmoregulation. In human beings, it is rudimentary, appears at the end of the third week (day 20) and replaced by mesonephros after 3.5 weeks. Despite this transient appearance in mammals, the pronephros is essential for the development of the adult kidneys. The duct of the mesonephros forms the Wolffian duct and ureter of the adult kidney. The embryonic kidney and its derivatives also produces the inductive signals that trigger formation of the adult kidney.

== Development ==
The pronephros is the first in a sequence of kidneys that form in vertebrate embryos. The pronephric primordium develops from the intermediate mesoderm, lying between the paraxial (somitic) mesoderm and the lateral plate. In many organisms (e.g. amphibians) this primodium forms anteriorly then migrates posteriorly to fuse with the cloaca, while in others it forms along the length of the intermediate mesoderm.

== Drainage ==
In both amphibians and zebrafish, the pronephros has a single nephron attached to a nephric duct, which in turn is linked to the cloaca. Although these kidneys have a simple anatomical organization with only a single nephron, the nephrons have a segmental and functional complexity that is very similar to that in more complex kidneys such as mesonephroi and metanephroi.

== Filtration ==
One unique feature of pronephroi is the arrangement by which the glomerular filtrate is generated and collected by the nephron. In pronephroi the glomerulus (or glomus if it extends over multiple body segments) projects into the coelom rather than into the proximal tip of the nephron. The glomerular filtrate flows directly into the coelom, or a dorsal compartment of the coelom known as the nephrocoel. In jawless fishes, the pronephric glomus projects into the pericardial cavity. Fluids are swept from the filtration cavity into the nephron through ciliated funnels known as nephrostomes. These thin epithelial tubes are densely packed with cilia and have a distinct morphology to the other tubular epithelia of the kidney.

== Relationship to nephrotomes ==
Older anatomical texts describe the pronephros as condensing from nephrotomes, but modern visualization techniques have shown that this represents a histological artifact.

== In amphibians, fishes, and mammals ==
Once the more complex mesonephros forms the pronephros undergoes apoptosis in amphibians. In fishes, the nephron degenerates but the organ remains and becomes a component of the immune system.

In mammals, a functional pronephros, in the context of an organ performing waste excretion or osmoregulation, does not develop. However, a kidney primordium that runs along the intermediate mesoderm does form and links up to the cloaca. This duct is known as the pronephric duct, mesonephric duct or Wolffian duct. While this transient primordium never forms functional nephrons, the duct derived from it is essential to the development of the more complex later kidneys.

== See also ==
- Mesonephros
- Metanephros
