= Kidney development =

Kidney development, or nephrogenesis, describes the embryologic origins of the kidney, a major organ in the urinary system. This article covers a 3 part developmental process that is observed in most reptiles, birds and mammals, including humans. Nephrogenesis is often considered in the broader context of the development of the urinary and reproductive organs.

== Phases ==
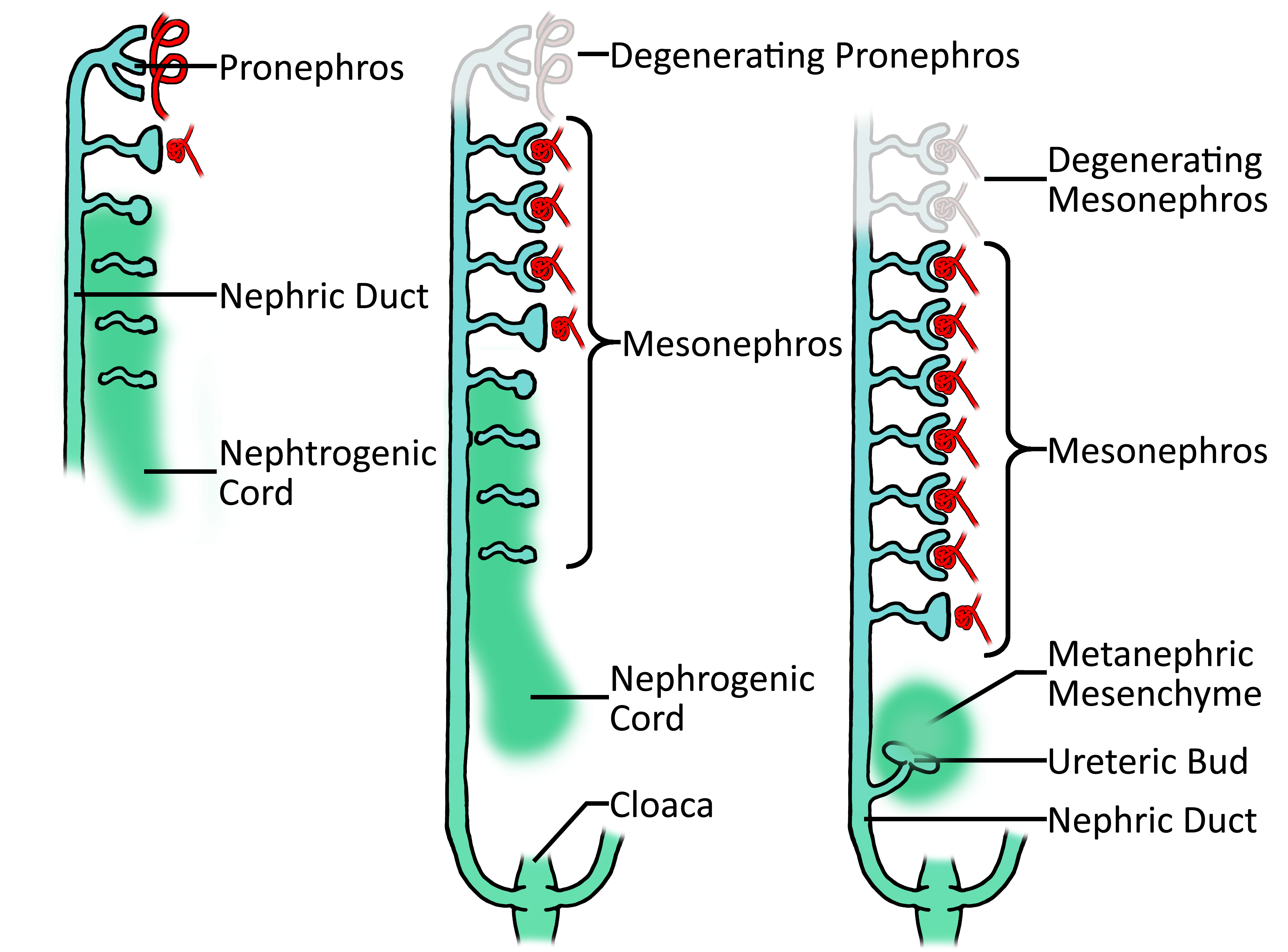
Diagram shows the sequential development and degeneration of the pronephros and mesonephros, and the induction of the ureteric bud and metanephric mesenchyme during kidney development in mammals.

The development of the kidney proceeds through a series of successive phases, each marked by the development of a more advanced kidney: the archinephros, pronephros, mesonephros, and metanephros. The pronephros is the most immature form of kidney, while the metanephros is most developed. The metanephros persists as the definitive adult kidney.

=== Archinephros ===
The archinephros is considered as hypothetical or primitive kidney.

=== Pronephros ===
The pronephros develops in the cervical region of the embryo. During approximately day 22 of human gestation, the paired pronephri appears towards the cranial end of the intermediate mesoderm. In this region, epithelial cells arrange themselves in a series of tubules called nephrotomes and join laterally with the pronephric duct. This duct is fully contained within the embryo and thus cannot excrete filtered material outside the embryo; therefore the pronephros is considered nonfunctional in humans.

=== Mesonephros ===
The development of the pronephric duct proceeds in a cranial-to-caudal direction. As it elongates caudally, the pronephric duct induces nearby intermediate mesoderm in the thoracolumbar area to become epithelial tubules called mesonephric tubules. Each mesonephric tubule receives a blood supply from a branch of the aorta, ending in a capillary tuft analogous to the glomerulus of the definitive nephron. The mesonephric tubule forms a capsule around the capillary tuft, allowing for filtration of blood. This filtrate flows through the mesonephric tubule and is drained into the continuation of the pronephric duct, now called the mesonephric duct or Wolffian duct. The nephrotomes of the pronephros degenerate while the mesonephric duct extends towards the most caudal end of the embryo, ultimately attaching to the cloaca. The mammalian mesonephros is similar to the kidneys of aquatic amphibians and fishes.

=== Metanephros ===
During the fifth week of gestation, the mesonephric duct develops an outpouching, the ureteric bud, near its attachment to the cloaca. This bud, also called the metanephrogenic diverticulum, grows posteriorly and towards the head of the embryo. The elongated stalk of the ureteric bud, called the metanephric duct, later forms the ureter. As the cranial end of the bud extends into the intermediate mesoderm, it undergoes a series of branchings to form the collecting duct system of the kidney. It also forms the major and minor calyces and the renal pelvis.

The portion of undifferentiated intermediate mesoderm in contact with the tips of the branching ureteric bud is known as the metanephrogenic blastema. Signals released from the ureteric bud induce the differentiation of the metanephrogenic blastema into the renal tubules. As the renal tubules grow, they come into contact and join with connecting tubules of the collecting duct system, forming a continuous passage for flow from the renal tubule to the collecting duct. Simultaneously, precursors of vascular endothelial cells begin to take their position at the tips of the renal tubules. These cells differentiate into the cells of the definitive glomerulus.

In humans, all of the branches of the ureteric bud and the nephronic units have been formed by 32 to 36 weeks of gestation. However, these structures are not yet mature, and will continue to mature after birth. Once matured, humans have an estimated two million nephrons (approximately 1,000,000 per kidney) but this number is highly variable ranging widely from approximately 200,000 to over 2.5 million per kidney.

== Migration ==
After inducing the metanephric mesenchyme the lower portions of the nephric duct will migrate caudally (downward) and connect with the bladder, thereby forming the ureters. The ureters will carry urine from the kidneys to the bladder for excretion from the fetus into the amniotic sac. As the fetus develops, the torso elongates and the kidneys rotate and migrate upwards within the abdomen which causes the length of the ureters to increase.
