= Mesonephros =

Principal excretory organ during early human embryonic life

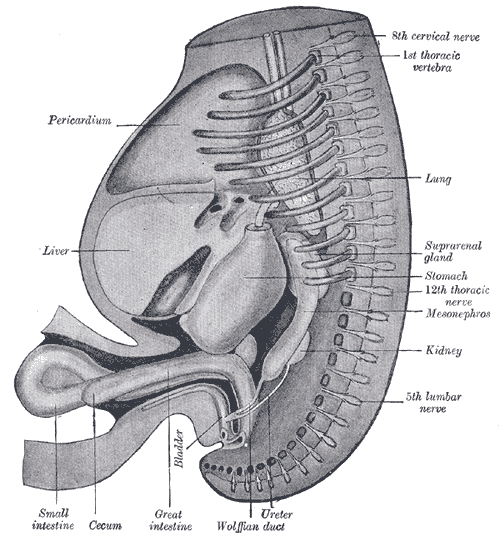
- Reconstruction of a human embryo of 17 mm. (Mesonephros labelled at center right)

Details
- Carnegie stage: 14
- Days: 22
- Precursor: Pronephros
- Gives rise to: Kidney

Identifiers
- Latin: mesonephros
- MeSH: D008650
- TE: E5.6.2.0.0.0.1
- FMA: 72171

The mesonephros (Greek: middle kidney) is one of three excretory organs that develop in vertebrates. It serves as the main excretory organ of aquatic vertebrates and as a temporary kidney in reptiles, birds, and mammals.

The mesonephros is also known as the Wolffian body after Caspar Friedrich Wolff who described it in 1759 as the combination of the mesonephros and the paramesonephrotic blastema.

== Structure ==
The mesonephros acts as a structure similar to the kidney that, in humans, functions between the sixth and tenth weeks of embryonic development. Despite the similarity in structure, function, and terminology, however, the mesonephric nephrons do not form any part of the mature kidney or nephrons.

In humans, the mesonephros consists of units which are similar in structure and function to nephrons of the adult kidney. Each of these consists of a glomerulus, a tuft of capillaries which arises from lateral branches of dorsal aorta and drains into the inferior cardinal vein; a Bowman's capsule, a funnel like structure which surrounds the glomerulus; and a mesonephric tubule, a tube which connects the Bowman's capsule to the mesonephric duct. A unit consisting of a single glomerulus and the Bowman's capsule surrounding it is called a renal corpuscle, and a unit consisting of single renal corpuscle with its associated mesonephric tubule is called a nephron or an "excretory mesonephric unit".

=== Development ===
==== Mesonephric vesicle ====
The formation of each mesonephric nephron begins when a part of the intermediate mesoderm adjacent to the mesonephric duct differentiates to form a mesonephric vesicle.

==== Mesonephric tubules ====
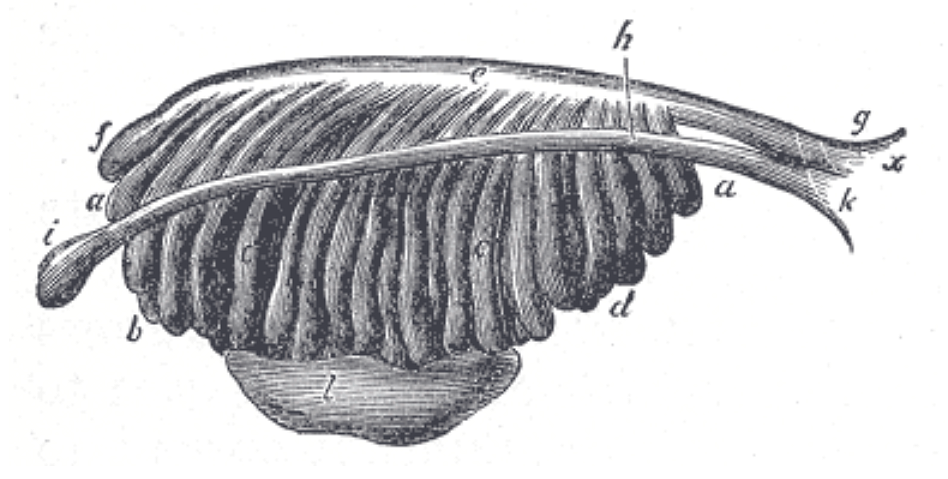
Enlarged view from the front of the left Wolffian body before the establishment of the distinction of sex. a, b, c, d. Tubular structure of the Wolffian body. e. mesonephric duct. f. Its upper extremity. g. Its termination in x, the urogenital sinus. h. The duct of Müller. i. Its upper, funnel-shaped extremity. k. Its lower end, terminating in the urogenital sinus. l. The genital gland.

This vesicle then elongates to form the mesonephric tubule, attaching to the mesonephric duct on one side. Meanwhile, an artery from the dorsal aorta begins extending towards the mesonephric tubule. When these two structures contact each other, they form the glomerulus and the Bowman's capsule surrounding it. The mesonephric tubule is also known as the Wolffian tubules (or Kobelt's tubules).

On the medial side of the mesonephric duct, from the sixth cervical to the third lumbar segments, a series of mesonephric tubules develop. They increase in number by outgrowths from the original tubules. They change from solid masses of cells to become hollowed in the center. One end grows toward and finally opens into the mesonephric duct, the other dilates and is invaginated by a tuft of capillary bloodvessels to form a glomerulus.

==== Formation ====
The tubules collectively constitute the mesonephros.

== Function ==
The mesonephros as a whole produces urine from the 6th through the 10th week of development. Despite the similarity in structure, function, and terminology, however, the mesonephric nephrons do not form any part of the mature kidney or nephrons. As the more caudal nephrons form, the more cranial nephrons are already degenerating. In females, the mesonephros degenerates entirely, though vestigial structures such as Gartner's ducts, the epoophoron, and paroophoron are common. In males, a few of the more caudal tubules will survive and give rise to the efferent ductules of the testis, the epididymis, vas deferens, seminal vesicle, as well as vestigial structures such as the appendix testis, appendix epididymis, and paradidymis.

== Other animals ==
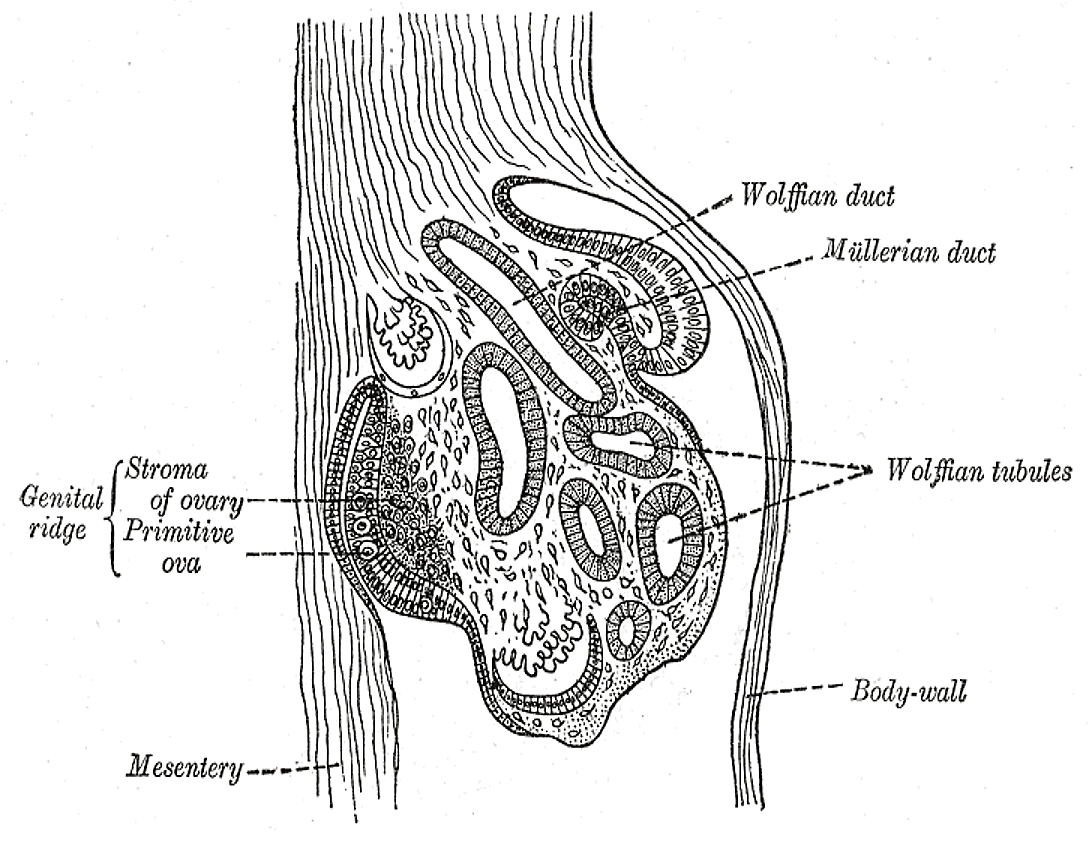
Section of the fold in the mesonephros of a chick embryo of the fourth day. Wolffian tubules are labeled to the right.

The mesonephros persists and forms the anterior portion of the permanent kidneys in fish and amphibians, but in reptiles, birds, and mammals, it atrophies and for the most part disappears rapidly as the permanent kidney (metanephros) begins to develop during the sixth or seventh week. By the beginning of the fifth month of human development, only the ducts and a few of the tubules of the mesonephros remain.

== Additional images ==
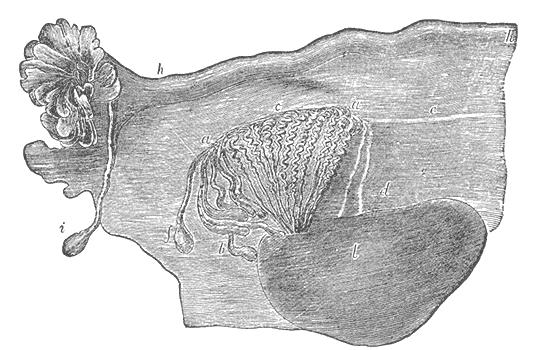
Broad ligament of adult, showing epoophoron

== See also ==
- pronephros
- metanephros
- paramesonephric ducts, ducts beside (para-) the mesonephros
