= Sinus tubercle =

Proliferation of endoderm induced by the paramesonephric ducts

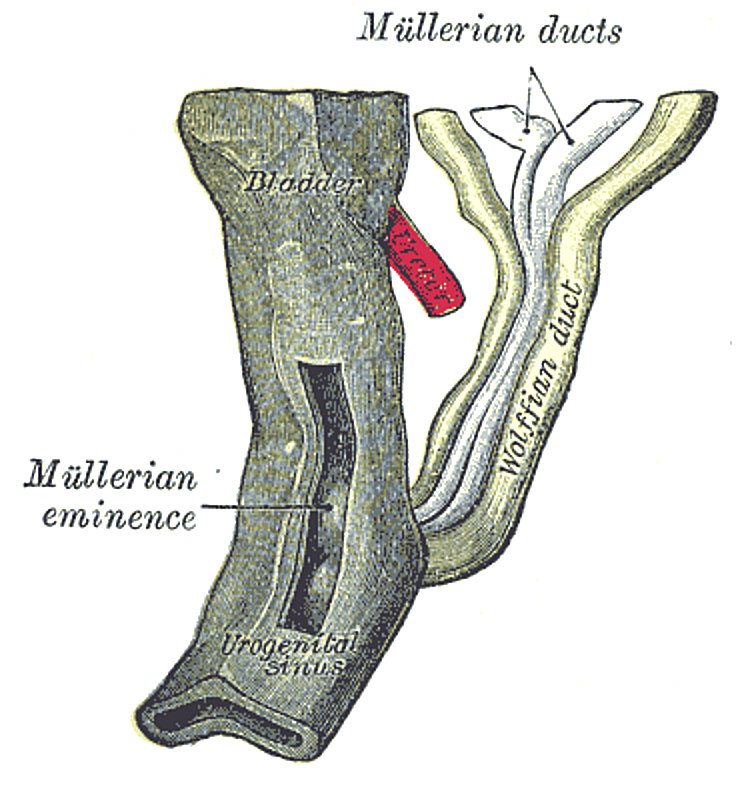
- Urogenital sinus of female human embryo of eight and a half to nine weeks old.

Sinus tubercle (also known as sinual tubercle or Müllerian eminence) is the proliferation of endoderm induced by the paramesonephric ducts. It is located in the developing fetus between the orifices of the mesonephric ducts on the urogenital sinus. The uterovaginal primoridium, which is a fusion of the caudal ends of paramesonephric ducts, contacts the dorsal wall of the urogenital sinus and, induces the formation of the sinus tubercle. This occurs in both sexes:

- In the female, the mesonephric duct loses all association with the gonad and disappears. The sinus tubercle then gives rise to the sino-vaginal bulbs and, when it later becomes solid it is referred to as the vaginal plate. It likewise gives rise to the hymen, which eventually breaks down in most cases.
- In the males, the sinus tubercle gives rise to the seminal colliculus.
