= Sex cords =

Embryonic structures that become gonads

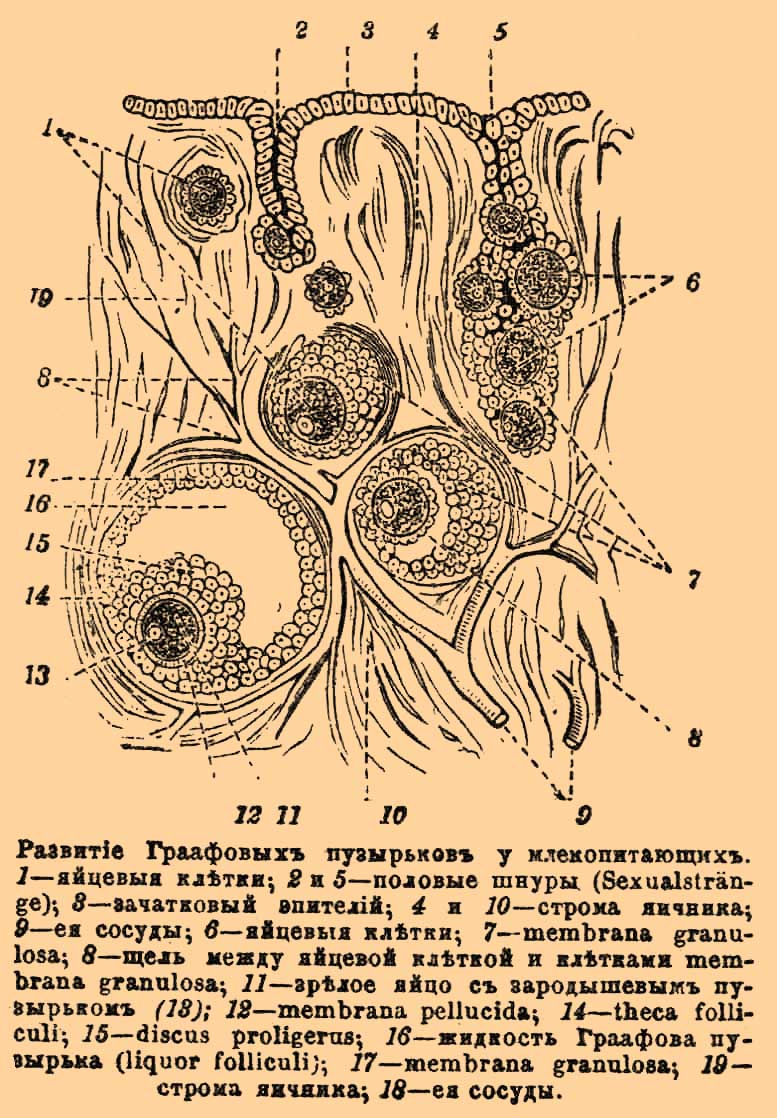
2 and 5 sex cords

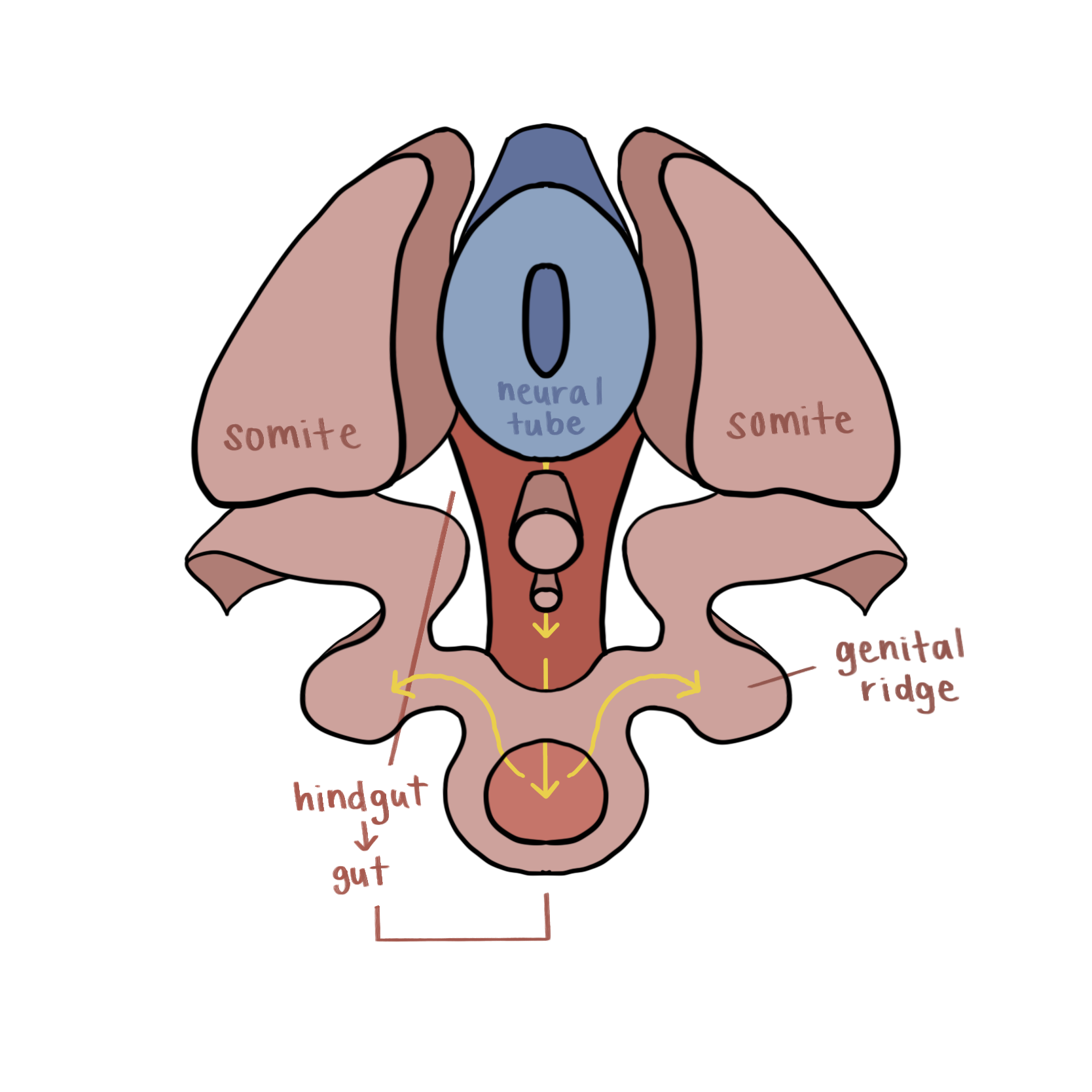
A depiction of the migration of the cells which will give rise to the sex cords into the genital ridge where they will become the gonads of the embryo

Sex cords in embryonic development give rise to the gonads of the reproductive system. In the female the sex cords are known as cortical cords of the developing ovary. In the male the sex cords are known as the testis cords of the developing testicle.

They are formed from the genital ridges - which will develop into the gonads - in the first two months of gestation (embryonic development) which depending on the sex of the embryo will give rise to male or female sex cords. These epithelial cells (from the genital ridges) penetrate and invade the underlying mesenchyme to form the primitive sex cords. This occurs shortly before and during the arrival of the primordial germ cells (PGCs) to the paired genital ridges. If there is a Y chromosome present, testicular cords will develop via the Sry gene (on the Y chromosome): repressing the female sex cord genes and activating the male. If there is no Y chromosome present the opposite will occur, developing ovarian cords. Prior to giving rise to sex cords, both XX and XY embryos have Müllerian ducts and Wolffian ducts. One of these structures will be repressed to induce the other to further differentiate into the external genitalia.

== Male sex cord development ==
Sex cords

Details
- Precursor: Genital ridge
- Gives rise to: Testis cords, cortical cords
- System: Reproductive system

Identifiers
- Latin: chorda sexualis primordialis gonadalis
- TE: cords_by_E5.7.1.1.0.0.7 E5.7.1.1.0.0.7

Once the genital ridge has committed to becoming male sex cords, Sertoli cells develop. These cells then induce the production and organisation of cells making up the testicular cords. These cords will eventually become the testes, which in turn produce hormones, in particular testosterone. These hormones drive the formation of the other male sex characteristics, and induce testicular descent out of the abdomen. These hormones also cause the development of the male reproductive tract. Embryos are formed with Wolffian and Mullerian ducts, which will either become the male or female reproductive tract, respectively. In a male embryo, the testicular cords will induce the development of the Wolffian duct into the vas deferens, epididymis and the seminal vesicle and cause the repression and regression of the Mullerian duct. The other male sex organs (ex. the prostate) as well as external genitalia are also formed under the influence of testosterone.

== Female sex cord development ==
Female sex cord development depends on specific genes being expressed, where multiple pro-ovarian genes (including Wnt4, FoxL2, and Rsp01) and the lack of Sry gene expression are responsible. The lack of testosterone allows for Müllerian duct proliferation, and Wolffian duct repression. The lack of male sex hormones gives rise to female sex cords and subsequent genitalia differentiation, rather than a presence of female sex hormones. After inducing female sex cord formation, coordination between multiple genes (Bmp, Pax2, Lim1, and Wnt4 in mice) is required for Müllerian duct development. Once the Müllerian ducts are determined, genes contributing to cell identity and positioning (specifically, Hox genes) play a key role in developing female reproductive structures. The Hox genes are expressed in specific combinations to give rise to the fallopian tubes, uterus, and upper region of the vagina.

Developing internal female genitalia, from the Müllerian ducts, occurs in three phases. First, cells are directed to proliferate on the female reproductive structure development pathway. Phase two is invagination: referring to the ducts folding in on themselves, forming openings of the fallopian tubes. In phase three, Müllerian ducts proliferate and elongate, subsequently forming the uterus and upper region of the vagina. Fallopian tubes form at the end closer to the head of the body, and the uterus and upper portion of the vagina form at the opposite end.

== Unusual development/different species ==
In early prenatal development, amphibians and elasmobranchs have gonads with a dual structure: a gonadal cortex, associated with ovarian differentiation, and a gonadal medulla, associated with testicular differentiation. In contrast, amniotes have single-structure gonads. Sex-specific development is dependent on the fate of the primary sex cord. There are also species-specific anomalies in sex cord development. Freemartin cattle are one notable phenomenon of abnormal gonad development. These are genetically female cattle that develop testicle-like structures in replacement of ovaries due to exchange of blood during development in parabiosis with male twin(s).

== See also ==
- Development of the gonads
- Sex cord–gonadal stromal tumour
