= Genital ridge =

Developmental precursor to the gonads in an embryo

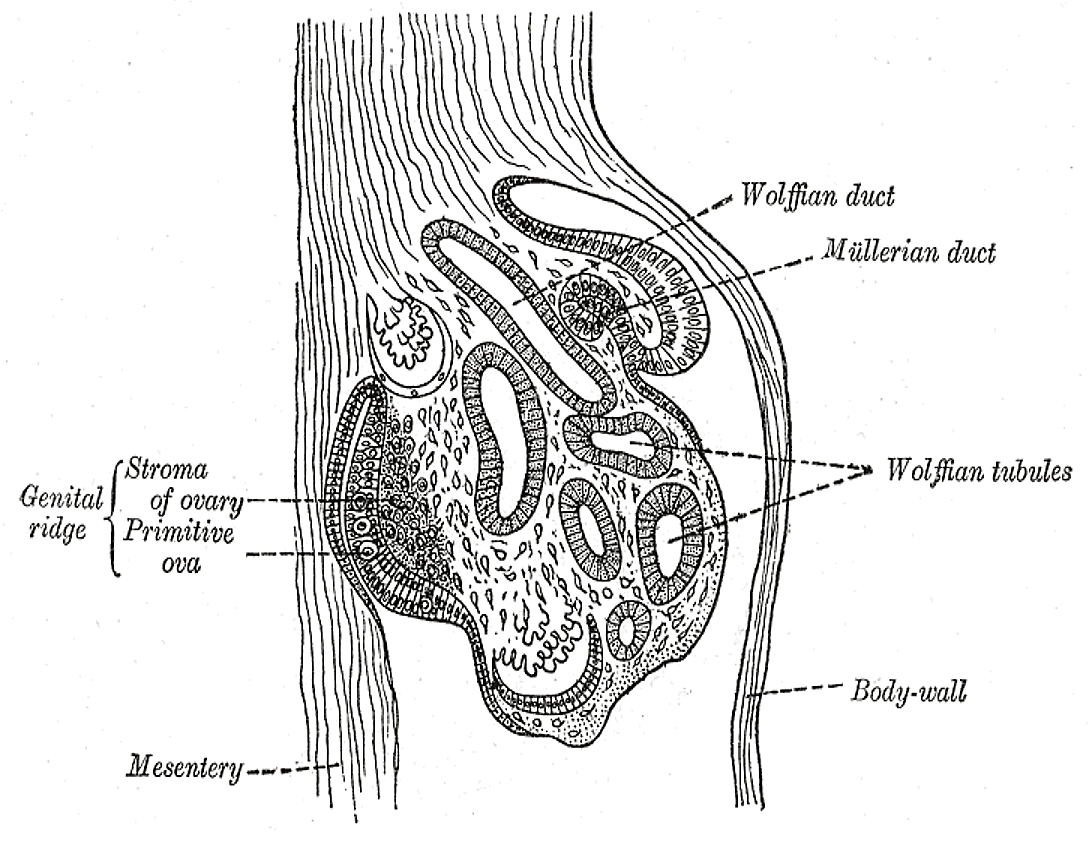
- Section of the fold in the mesonephros of a chick embryo of the fourth day. (Genital ridge labeled at left.)

Details
- Precursor: Urogenital folds
- Gives rise to: Sex cords
- System: Reproductive system

Identifiers
- Latin: crista gonadalis
- TE: ridge_by_E5.7.1.0.0.0.5 E5.7.1.0.0.0.5

The genital ridge (genital fold or gonadal ridge) is part of the urogenital ridge in the development of the genitourinary system. The other part of the ridge is the nephrogenic cord, the source of much of the urinary system.

The genital ridge is a structure in early human embryonic development (around week five) that gives rise to the sex cords, the precursors of the reproductive system's gonads . The genital ridge initially consists mainly of mesenchyme and cells of underlying mesonephric origin.

The sex cords differentiate into male and female cords. In the female the sex cords are known as cortical cords, and give rise to the ovary, and in the male are known as testis cords that give rise to the testicle.

== Associated genes ==
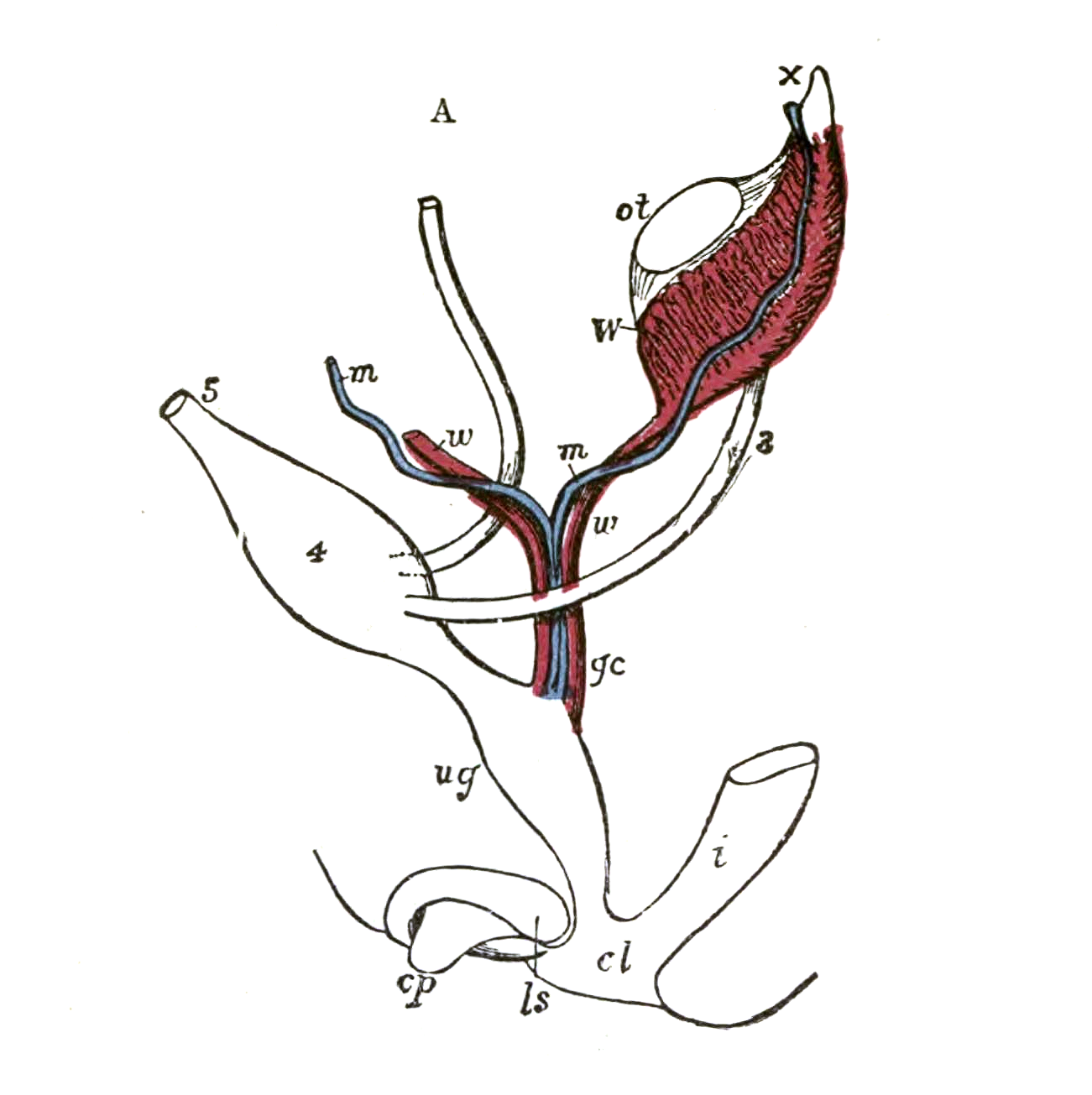
A.—Diagram of the primitive urogenital organs in the embryo previous to sexual distinction. * 3. Ureter. * 4. Urinary bladder. * 5. Urachus. * cl. Cloaca. * cp. Elevation which becomes clitoris or penis. * i. Lower part of the intestine. * ls. Fold of integument from which the labia majora or scrotum are formed. * m, m. Right and left Müllerian ducts uniting together and running with the Wolffian ducts in gc, the genital cord. * ot. The genital ridge from which either the ovary or testis is formed (upper right). * ug. Sinus urogenitalis. * W. Left Wolffian body. * w, w. Right and left Wolffian ducts.

Genes associated with the developing gonads can be categorized into those that form the sexually indifferent gonad, those that determine whether the indifferent gonad will differentiate as male or female, and those that promote differentiation into male or female parts. Genes that form the sexually indifferent gonad are SF1 and WT1. Genes that determine sex are SRY, SOX9, and DAX1. Genes driving the differentiation into male or female structures are SF1, WT1, and WNT4. The other genes have roles in development that are not exclusively sex-related.

=== DMRT1 ===
Evidence suggests that a DM domain gene, DMRT1, is involved in sexual development. This gene is located on chromosome 9. Its location suggests that it is required for the development of testis. XY humans hemizygous for the chromosome 9p, where DMRT1 is located, are often feminized. This feminization can range from ambiguous genitalia to XY sex reversal.

=== SRY ===
The genital ridge houses the transcript for SRY, the Y-chromosomal gene responsible for sex determination. The urogenital ridge is made up of the gonadal anlage and the mesonephros. The mesonephros is involved in the development of the testis, but its role is in differentiation, and not determination. This is indicated by the absence of SRY expression in the mesonephros. SRY expression is expressed exclusively in the developing gonad, lacking a presence in any other tissue in embryos or adults.

== Other animals ==
The DMRT1 homolog from chicken has been localized on the Z chromosome. Birds have heterogametic females (ZW) and homogametic males (ZZ). The avian Z chromosome shows conserved synteny with chromosome 9 of humans. ZZ embryos have a higher dose of DMRT1 and therefore have the potential to have a higher expression. It has been suggested that embryos with a higher expression of Dmrt1 expression develop into males while embryos with a lower expression are led to female development.

In the mouse gonadal primordium, the genital ridge, which forms from intermediate mesoderm, becomes morphologically distinct at E10.5. By E12, sexual differentiation of the gonad is apparent, indicating that genes involved in the formation of the bipotential gonad are expressed before E10.5 and E12. Before E10.5, Dmrt1 is expressed at similar levels in the genital ridges of XX as well as XY embryos. By E12.5 and E13.5, DMRT1 is expressed deferentially as sex specific structures start to form. By E14.5 and E15.5, DMRT1 expression is maintained in the testis while it has begun to decrease in the ovary.
