= Lim1 =

Lim1 or Lim-1 may refer to:

- LHX1, a gene/protein sometimes called Lim1
- Lim-1, a variant of the Mikoyan-Gurevich MiG-15 aircraft
- $\varprojlim{}^1$, the first derived functor of the inverse limit
