= Sex in humans =

Sex in humans may refer to:

- Human sexual activity
- Sex assignment
- Sexual differentiation in humans
