= Nephrogenic cord =

Details
- Precursor: intermediate mesoderm, urogenital ridge

Identifiers
- Latin: chorda nephrogenica
- TE: cord_by_E5.6.2.0.0.0.3 E5.6.2.0.0.0.3

The nephrogenic cord is a portion of the urogenital ridge which is the source of much of the urinary system.

The nephrogenic cords are bilateral condensations of the intermediate mesoderm. The cords extend from the cervical segments to the sacral segments of the embryo. The nephrogenic cords are located on the posterior wall of the embryo, which is where the kidneys are located. The nephrogenic cords go through three phases of development which overlap to some extent, both in space and in time. The 1st phase is the pronephros, the 2nd phase is the mesonephros and the 3rd and final stage is the metanephros.
