= Genitography =

Medical imaging technique

Genitography is the radiography of the urogenital sinus and internal duct structures after injection of a contrast medium through the opening of the sinus.
