= LHX1 =

Protein-coding gene in the species Homo sapiens

Identifiers
- Aliases: LHX1, LIM-1, LIM1, LIM homeobox 1
- External IDs: OMIM: 601999; MGI: 99783; GeneCards: LHX1

Gene location (Human)
| Chr. | Chromosome 17 (human) |
| Band | 17q12 | Start | 36,936,785 bp |
| Band | 17q12 | End | 36,944,612 bp |

Gene location (Mouse)
| Chr. | Chromosome 11 (mouse) |
| Band | 11 C|11 51.31 cM | Start | 84,409,110 bp |
| Band | 11 C|11 51.31 cM | End | 84,416,361 bp |
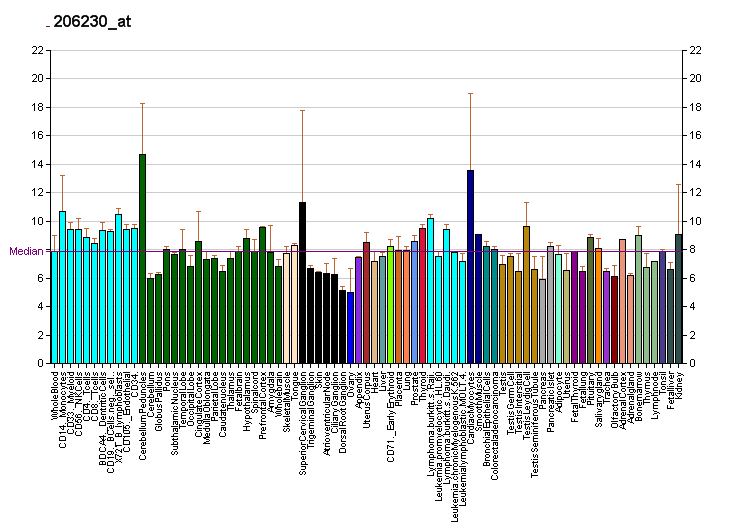
RNA expression pattern
| Bgee | Human / Mouse (ortholog); Top expressed in: cerebellum; cerebellar cortex; cerebellar hemisphere; right hemisphere of cerebellum; human kidney; gonad; hypothalamus; right uterine tube; substantia nigra; ventricular zone / Top expressed in: hypoblast; suprachiasmatic nucleus; connecting tubule; mesoderm; mesorchium; intermediate mesoderm; paramesonephric duct; lobe of cerebellum; glomerulus; cerebellar vermis; More reference expression data |
| BioGPS | More reference expression data |
Gene ontology
| Molecular function | sequence-specific DNA binding; DNA binding; transcription corepressor activity; DNA-binding transcription factor activity; metal ion binding; DNA-binding transcription factor activity, RNA polymerase II-specific; RNA polymerase II transcription regulatory region sequence-specific DNA binding; cis-regulatory region sequence-specific DNA binding |
| Cellular component | intracellular anatomical structure; nucleus; protein-containing complex; transcription regulator complex |
| Biological process | pattern specification process; pronephros development; oviduct epithelium development; cell differentiation; renal system development; ureteric bud development; positive regulation of branching involved in ureteric bud morphogenesis; mesonephric tubule development; regulation of transcription, DNA-templated; retina layer formation; comma-shaped body morphogenesis; spinal cord association neuron differentiation; embryonic pattern specification; mesonephric duct development; uterine epithelium development; kidney development; positive regulation of gastrulation; vagina development; metanephric glomerulus development; cell-cell signaling; somite rostral/caudal axis specification; anatomical structure morphogenesis; gastrulation with mouth forming second; cerebellar Purkinje cell differentiation; cerebellar Purkinje cell-granule cell precursor cell signaling involved in regulation of granule cell precursor cell proliferation; anatomical structure formation involved in morphogenesis; head development; metanephric renal vesicle morphogenesis; transcription by RNA polymerase II; post-embryonic development; cellular response to fibroblast growth factor stimulus; renal vesicle morphogenesis; lateral motor column neuron migration; cerebellum development; nervous system development; transcription, DNA-templated; nephric duct elongation; ventral spinal cord development; cervix development; uterus development; positive regulation of transcription, DNA-templated; epithelium development; mesonephros development; multicellular organism development; metanephric comma-shaped body morphogenesis; telencephalon development; branching involved in ureteric bud morphogenesis; forebrain regionalization; positive regulation of anterior head development; metanephric part of ureteric bud development; S-shaped body morphogenesis; retina development in camera-type eye; nephric duct morphogenesis; oviduct development; spinal cord development; embryonic retina morphogenesis in camera-type eye; animal organ morphogenesis; regulation of gene expression; paramesonephric duct development; urogenital system development; embryonic viscerocranium morphogenesis; metanephric S-shaped body morphogenesis; endoderm formation; anterior/posterior axis specification; horizontal cell localization; positive regulation of embryonic development; motor neuron axon guidance; dorsal/ventral pattern formation; negative regulation of transcription, DNA-templated; metanephros development; primitive streak formation; ectoderm formation; anterior/posterior pattern specification; positive regulation of nephron tubule epithelial cell differentiation; dorsal spinal cord interneuron posterior axon guidance; regulation of transcription by RNA polymerase II; neuron differentiation; positive regulation of transcription by RNA polymerase II; ureter morphogenesis; endoderm development; mesendoderm development |
Sources:Amigo / QuickGO
Orthologs
| Databases | NCBI: entry; OMA: entry |
| Species | Human | Mouse |
| Entrez | 3975 | 16869 |
| Ensembl | ENSG00000273706; ENSG00000274577 | ENSMUSG00000018698 |
| UniProt | P48742; Q58F18 | P63006 |
| RefSeq (mRNA) | NM_005568 | NM_008498 |
| RefSeq (protein) | NP_005559; NP_005559.2 | NP_032524 |
| Location (UCSC) | Chr 17: 36.94 – 36.94 Mb | Chr 11: 84.41 – 84.42 Mb |
| PubMed search |
- Wikidata
| View/Edit Human | View/Edit Mouse |

LIM homeobox 1 also known as Lim-1 is a protein that in humans is encoded by the LHX1 gene. This gene encodes a member of a large protein family which contains the LIM domain, a unique cysteine-rich zinc-binding domain. The encoded protein is a transcription factor important for control of differentiation and development of neural and lymphoid cells. It is also key in development of renal and urogenital systems and is required for normal organogenesis.

In mice, this factor is an essential regulator of the vertebrate head organizer. This transcription factor is found in adults in the cerebellum, kidneys, and cerebrum, but plays a larger role in development of the fetal head and the female reproductive tract during gestation. During development it is found in the anterior visceral endoderm, is in tissues formed by the primitive streak, and is required in both tissues for head formation.

== Function ==
The Lim gene family is a subfamily of homeobox genes. The homeobox genes are essential in organizing the body plan of an organism and all contain the same conserved homeodomain of amino acids. Evidence that Lim-1 is essential to a developing organism is its conservation throughout evolution and presence in a variety of organisms. The Lim-1 gene encodes a transcription factor which binds to the DNA of specific genes and functions to produce the needed gene product for development of the organism. Lim-1 is important during early molecular development and is required in both primitive streak-derived tissue and visceral endoderm of the early embryo for development of a head. Studies done using mutant organisms without the Lim gene results in organisms that develop no head structure at all support the essential role of the Lim-1 gene in formation of the head. This gene has also been shown to play a crucial role in the formation of the female reproductive tract. The gene is expressed in the developing Müllerian duct of females, and when the gene is knocked out no reproductive tract forms. Recent studies have shown that Lim-1 mutations may be one cause of the Mayer-Rokitansky-Küster-Hauser (MRKH) syndrome. MRKH is characterized by defective development, or absence, of the uterus and upper part of the vagina in women with normal ovaries and karyotype.

Lim-1's expression is controlled in part by the sonic hedgehog-Gli signaling pathway. Recent studies in mice have shown that Lim-1 silencing halts tumor growth and impairs tumor cell movement via inhibition of protein expression involved in metastatic spread. Therefore, in tumor cells Lim-1 acts as an oncogene. Thus, targeting Lim-1 can be a potential cancer therapy. In addition, Lim-1 is important in rodent renal development. Lim-1 deficiency results in development of multicystic kidney, whereas, its expression can contribute to pathogenesis of nephroblastomas. Also, Lim-1 plays a role in embryonic retinal development. Lim-1 expression affects differentiation and maintenance of horizontal cells located in the retinal, thus, it could serve as a marker in studies of horizontal cell specification.

Lim-1 (Lhx1) functions as a transcription factor necessary for regulating the production of coupling factors required for proper communication between the neurons located in the part of the brain responsible for regulation of circadian rhythms called the suprachiasmatic nucleus (SCN). In mouse studies where Lim-1 transcription was restricted at some point during development in utero, the individual units within the subject's molecular clock functioned properly but were unable to work together. Communication of these units is required to match their release of clock proteins which begin a transcription cascade of many other proteins that produce functional responses in tissues. The cyclic pattern of these responses is due to the feedback of the clock proteins and consequent changes to this transcription cascade. Reduced Lim-1 expression leads to inadequate levels of proteins such as Vasoactive Intestinal Polypeptide (VIP) that work to produce the neuron coordination required for a regulated circadian rhythm. The lack of such coupling factors causes the circadian clock to not function properly because the units within the SCN cannot match their release of clock proteins, and therefore their transcriptional cascades of proteins that cause changes in arousal do not align.

== Developmental roles ==
=== Formation of the future head ===
In mice, Lim-1 acts in the early development of the mesoderm and ectoderm layers of the developing embryo. The factor is induced by the increasing concentrations of Cerberus, DKK1, and Nodal around day 7–9 in the mouse embryo. Lim-1 contributes to the formation of the anterior portion of the developing head containing the forebrain and midbrain. Research studies have shown that knocking out Lim-1 in mice will cause a range of head deformities, including the complete lack of formation of the head.

=== Female reproductive tract ===
Lim-1 is also essential for the development of the female reproductive tract, as it causes the persistence of the Müllerian ducts that will eventually develop into the oviducts, uterus, cervix, and vagina. Without the expression of Lim-1, formation of the epithelial and mesenchymal cells of the reproductive tract will not occur. While the ovaries will develop, female mice will develop without a uterus and oviducts.

=== Kidney ===
Although Lim-1 is primarily associated with head development in embryogenesis, the transcription factor also plays a role in forming the urogenital system. Since Lim-1 is crucial for head development, most Lim-1-deficient embryos die early in gestation. Thus, to study the role of Lim-1 on the mesonephros, a conditional knockout model was employed in mice whereby Lim-1 was selectively removed from the nephric epithelium just after it began to form. The Lim-1 conditional knockout mice had renal hypoplasia and hydronephrosis, thus demonstrating that Lim-1 regulates the differentiation of the nephric epithelium. Since the extension of the nephric duct as well as the outgrowth of the ureteric bud are influenced by Lim-1, defects in this transcription factor are associated with Potter Syndrome, a rare, fatal congenital disorder. Without the proper induction of ureteric buds and mesonephric ducts by Lim-1 and other transcription factors, nephrogenesis is impaired. Renal impairment can cause oligohydramnios, a feature which is characteristic of Potter's syndrome. Oligohydramnios is brought about when a continual swallowing of amniotic fluid is paired with a lack of urinary excretion, reducing amniotic fluid volume. Thus, the necessity of proper Lim-1 activity in patterning a functional urogenital system that is conducive to life is exemplified by Potter's Syndrome.

== Renal cell carcinoma ==
Although Lim-1 is mainly expressed during gestation, in adult life Lim-1 can be re-expressed in the renal tract only when Clear Cell Renal Cell Carcinoma (CCC) is present in the body. Lim-1 acts as an oncogene in CCC and becomes a growth factor and a survival factor through overexpression. Lim-1 is expressed by the tumors that develop from CCC. Tumor growth is determined by the rate of Lim-1 expression, so as Lim-1 expression increases, CCC tumor size increases, and when Lim-1 expression is silenced, CCC tumor growth declines. From these findings, scientists have discovered that targeting Lim-1 in CCC could result in an innovative therapeutic intervention, which could lead to a potential cure for patients with CCC.

== Ssdp1 regulation on lim-1 ==
Lim-1 is a transcription factor that controls head and limb development. The primitive node will secrete the signaling molecules “Lefty” and “Cerebus” that then induce the expression of Lim-1, which will then induce formation of head structures. In one research article, “headshrinker mutants”, were also defined by the Ssdp1 gene being disrupted, which also seemed to be associated with defects in the head induction process. It turns out that this data showed Ssdp1 causing “defects in prechordal plate development and anterior truncations.” This data also discloses that Ssdp1 is a coactivator that enhances transcriptional activity with Lim-1 as a complex. These phenotypes expressed by Ssdp1 mutants most likely reflect reduced activity of a Lim-1 complex. So, while Lim-1 acts as the transcription factor heavily responsible for head development, there are many other factors that affect expression of the normal head phenotype.

== In mice ==
Lim1 is down regulated after embryonic day 7.5. Then, the Lim1 gene, with help from the anterior definitive mesoderm, goes to regulate sequential signaling from the anterior visceral endoderm. This signal regulation is necessary for head formation. The Lim1 gene is also expressed in adult life, possibly to maintain a differentiated state in neural tissue of adults. During embryogenesis, Lim1 is expressed from the central nervous system (CNS) and the excretory system (primarily the kidney). In the CNS, it is expressed approximately 10 days after fertilization and patterns the forebrain, midbrain, hindbrain, and spinal cord regions. In the spinal cord Lim1 is expressed in dorsal and lateral parts but is not detected in the ventricular region.
