= Sinovaginal bulb =

Transient structure in development

The sinovaginal bulb is a transitional structure in the development of female genitalia, and is one of a pair of endodermal outgrowths of the urogenital sinus, which later fuse to form the lower part of the vagina. The lower third of the vagina is derived from the urogenital sinus.

The hymen is formed from the same tissue as the sinovaginal bulb.
