= Protein Wnt-9B =

Protein-coding gene in the species Homo sapiens

WNT9B

Identifiers
- Aliases: WNT9B, WNT14B, WNT15, Wnt family member 9B
- External IDs: OMIM: 602864; MGI: 1197020; GeneCards: WNT9B

Gene location (Human)
Chr.	Chromosome 17 (human)
Band	17q21.32	Start	46,833,201 bp
Band	17q21.32	End	46,886,730 bp

Gene location (Mouse)
Chr.	Chromosome 11 (mouse)
Band	11 E1|11 67.47 cM	Start	103,618,190 bp
Band	11 E1|11 67.47 cM	End	103,640,647 bp
RNA expression pattern
Bgee	Human / Mouse (ortholog); Top expressed in: gonad; duodenum; human kidney; prefrontal cortex; placenta; apex of heart; superior frontal gyrus; primary visual cortex; right frontal lobe; right auricle of heart / Top expressed in: interventricular septum; medullary collecting duct; cortical collecting duct; surface ectoderm; labioscrotal swelling; semi-lunar valve; cloacal membrane; lateral geniculate nucleus; maxillary prominence; mandibular prominence; More reference expression data
BioGPS	n/a
Gene ontology
Molecular function	frizzled binding; signaling receptor binding; co-receptor binding; receptor ligand activity
Cellular component	extracellular region; extracellular space
Biological process	kidney morphogenesis; cell-cell signaling; cellular response to starvation; mesonephric duct formation; multicellular organism development; male genitalia development; cornea development in camera-type eye; branching morphogenesis of an epithelial tube; kidney rudiment formation; collecting duct development; regulation of asymmetric cell division; embryonic cranial skeleton morphogenesis; kidney development; Wnt signaling pathway, planar cell polarity pathway; cellular response to retinoic acid; mesenchymal stem cell maintenance involved in nephron morphogenesis; establishment of planar polarity involved in nephron morphogenesis; nephron tubule morphogenesis; roof of mouth development; metanephric tubule development; in utero embryonic development; regulation of tube size; mesonephric tubule development; uterus morphogenesis; response to retinoic acid; regulation of mesenchymal to epithelial transition involved in metanephros morphogenesis; cell fate commitment; branching involved in ureteric bud morphogenesis; positive regulation of catalytic activity; metanephric tubule formation; regulation of protein phosphorylation; negative regulation of stem cell population maintenance; midbrain dopaminergic neuron differentiation; non-canonical Wnt signaling pathway involved in midbrain dopaminergic neuron differentiation; Wnt signaling pathway; neuron differentiation; regulation of signaling receptor activity; canonical Wnt signaling pathway
Sources:Amigo / QuickGO
Orthologs
Databases	NCBI: entry; OMA: entry
Species	Human	Mouse
Entrez	7484	22412
Ensembl	ENSG00000158955; ENSG00000276799	ENSMUSG00000018486
UniProt	O14905	O35468
RefSeq (mRNA)	NM_003396; NM_001320458	NM_011719
RefSeq (protein)	NP_001307387; NP_003387	NP_035849
Location (UCSC)	Chr 17: 46.83 – 46.89 Mb	Chr 11: 103.62 – 103.64 Mb
PubMed search
- Wikidata
View/Edit Human	View/Edit Mouse

Protein Wnt-9b (formerly WNT15) is a protein that in humans is encoded by the WNT9B gene.

The WNT family of genes produce glycolipoproteins that are involved with signaling and developmental processes. Like other Wnt genes, WNT9B codes for the WNT9B protein which participates in the canonical Wnt/β-catenin signaling pathway. WNT9B is a gene found on chromosome 17 in region 17q21. It can be traced to function in the establishment of the kidneys, because WNT9 is critical for morphogenesis of the nephron.

This gene can impact kidney function in more than one way. Improper expression of the gene can cause cyst development on the kidney tubules, and in mice, mutant WNT9 genes that cause lower protein concentrations resulted in failure of the kidneys to thrive shortly after birth.

WNT9B is a gene that often expressed in the epithelial cells of the Wolffian duct in early male and female embryos. In the embryos, Wnt11 is expressed at the branching points of the kidney tubules while WNT9B is expressed in a higher concentration at the stalk of the tubules. WNT9B has also been tied to the involvement of neural differentiation by induction of retinoic acid, according to the NCBI.

WNT9B is expressed in the developing urogenital sinus epithelium (anlage of the prostate) and in the Wollfian duct. Autosomal dominant WNT9B pathogenic variants cause embryonic developmental sequence defects: Mayer-Rokitansky-Küster-Hauser syndrome in females, and Zinner syndrome in males. Syndrome presentation in males includes prostatic and seminal vesicle cysts, enlarged prostate, kidney agenesis, and ejaculatory duct obstruction. WNT9B mutant mice have absent Wolffian ducts, epididymis and vas deferens, without urogenital sinus-derived mesonephric duct and mesenchymal-derived tubular epithelia. HNF1B transcriptionally regulates WNT9B; HNF1B too has been cited as a cause of Mayer-Rokitansky-Küster-Hauser syndrome. Inheritance of a rare pathogenic mutation of WNT9B has been shown to carry significant risk of the subsequent development of prostate cancer. Estimated risk ranged from 2- to 12-fold across numerous independent study populations. Common genetic variation of HNF1B too has been established to impact prostate cancer risk. In mouse models, activation of the WNT pathway causes prostate intraepithelial neoplasia.
