= Paramesonephric duct =

Paired ducts in the mammalian embryo in the primitive urogenital structures

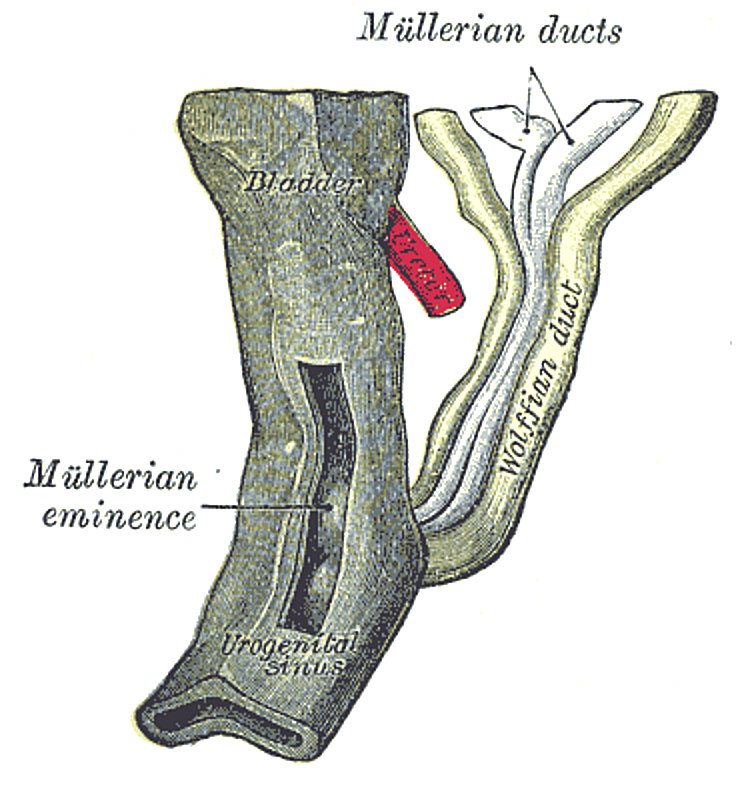
- Paramesonephric ducts (labelled as Müllerian ducts) shown in a human fetus of eight and a half to nine weeks old.

Details
- Carnegie stage: 17
- Precursor: Intermediate mesoderm

Identifiers
- Latin: ductus paramesonephricus
- MeSH: D009095
- TE: duct_by_E5.7.2.3.0.0.3 E5.7.2.3.0.0.3

The paramesonephric ducts (or Müllerian ducts) are paired ducts in the embryonic development of the reproductive system of humans and other placental mammals. The ducts run down the lateral sides of the genital ridge, and terminate at the sinus tubercle in the primitive urogenital sinus. In humans, they form in the embryo during the 6th week of gestational age, before sexual differentiation takes place. In the differentiated female, the paramesonephric ducts develop into the reproductive tract, that includes the fallopian tubes (oviducts), uterus, cervix, and the upper part of the vagina.

In the male-determined embryo, the testes produce two hormones responsible for masculinization – anti-Müllerian hormone (AMH), and testosterone. Sertoli cells secrete AMH, during weeks six and seven, which causes the paramesonephric ducts to regress. In week eight Leydig cells secrete testosterone which stimulates the formation of male genitals from the mesonephric ducts.

Each paramesonephric duct is situated just lateral to each mesonephric duct (Wolffian duct). The mesonephric ducts are not completely useless in the female case: they secrete protein Wnt-9b, which is necessary for the elongation of the paramesonephric ducts. Elongation also happens through the active migration of the paramesonephric epithelium, which happens through a phosphoinositide 3-kinase pathway.

== Development ==
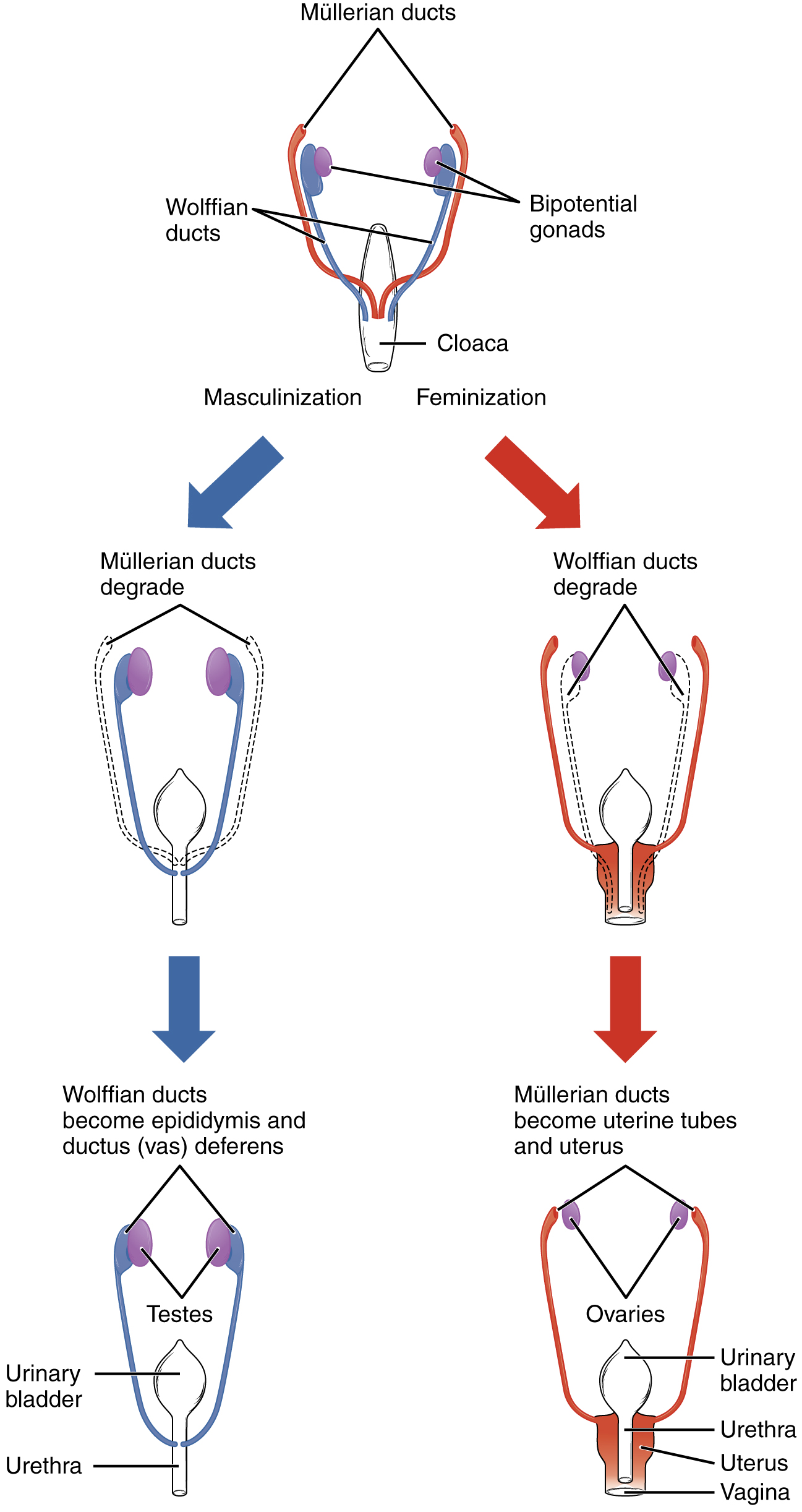
Schematic of sexual differentiation of the gonads

The female reproductive system develops from two embryological segments: the urogenital sinus and the paramesonephric ducts. The two are conjoined at the sinus tubercle. Paramesonephric ducts are present on the embryo of both sexes. Only in females do they develop into reproductive organs. They degenerate in males whereas the adjoining mesonephric ducts develop into male reproductive organs. The sex based differences in the contributions of the paramesonephric ducts to reproductive organs is based on the presence, and degree of presence, of anti-Müllerian hormone.

=== Initial formation ===
During the development of the reproductive system, the paramesonephric ducts are formed just lateral to the mesonephric ducts (formed earlier) in both female and male embryos 6 weeks after fertilization. A ribbon of thickened coelomic epithelium is selected by PAX2, and in turn the FGFs, and in turn LHX1, to become the Müllerian surface epithelium (MSE). During this time, primordial germ cells migrate from the yolk sac to the genital ridge, a region of mesenchyme running parallel with, and derived from, the mesonephros. The Müllerian duct mesenchyme (MDM) is formed from the MSE and possibly the mesonephros; WNT4 expression is required for this process. The MDM also secretes WNT4, which (together with other molecular factors) cause the craniocaudal invagination of the MSE. The invagination fuses into a duct, and the MSE becomes known as the Müllerian duct epithelium (MDE).

The early duct is short and needs to elongate to reach the urogenital sinus. This is caused by WNT9B produced by the neighboring mesonephric ducts.

By the time basic formation is complete, the duct's cross section consists of a central lumen, a layer of MDE, and a mass of MDM around it. The MDE produces WNT7A, which causes the MDM to produce AMHR2, allowing AMH to take effect. The caudal parts of the paramesonephric ducts fuse into a single tube, known as the uterovaginal primordium, before flowing into the dorsal aspect of the urogenital sinus at the sinus tubercle directly medial to the mesonephric ducts.

=== Anti-Müllerian hormone ===
The further development of the paramesonephric (Müllerian) ducts is controlled by anti-Müllerian hormone (AMH; also known as Müllerian-inhibiting substance, "MIF" for "Müllerian-inhibiting factor", "MIH" for "Müllerian-inhibiting hormone", or "APH" for anti-paramesonephric hormone).

Male embryogenesis	The developing testes produce AMH causing regression of the paramesonephric ducts.	Disturbances can lead to persistent Müllerian duct syndrome.	The ducts disappear except for the vestigial vagina masculina and the appendix testis.
Female embryogenesis	The absence of AMH results in the development of the paramesonephric ducts into the uterine tubes, uterus, and the upper 2/3 of the vagina.	Disturbance in the development may result in uterine absence (Müllerian agenesis) or uterine malformations.	The ducts develop into the upper vagina, uterus, and uterine tubes.

AMH is a glycoprotein hormone that is secreted by Sertoli cells (a type of sustentacular cell) in males as they begin their morphologic differentiation in response to SRY expression. AMH begins to be secreted around week 8, which in turn causes the paramesonephric ducts to regress very rapidly between the 8th and 10th weeks. However, small paramesonephric ducts can still be identified, and the remnants can be detected in the adult male, located in the appendix testis, a small cap of tissue associated with the testis. Remnants of the paramesonephric ducts can also be found in the prostatic utricle, an expansion of the prostatic urethra at the center of the seminal colliculus.

When AMH is present, it first activates AMHR2 (AMH receptor-type II) expressed by the MDM (mesenchymal) cells surrounding the duct. The activation of AMHR2 causes the expression of "type 1" receptors, which include ACVR1 (ALK2), BMPR1A (ALK3), or BMPR1B (ALK6). Both types I and II are required for the correct development of the male reproductive system. Collectively they initiate Smad signaling and lead to the expression of apoptosis-encouraging metalloproteases.

- In the absence of the Wnt7a within the duct epithelium as the ducts regress, ductal AMHR-II expression is lost, and residual paramesonephric ducts would be retained in males, throwing off the urogenital system.
- Cryptorchidism (undescended testis) or ectopic testis with inguinal hernias have been identified in human males due to AMH and AMHR-II gene mutations.
- When the type I receptors are blocked or knocked out in mice within the paramesonephric duct mesenchyme, AMH-induced paramesonephric duct regression is lost. However, some of the type I receptors can be compensated by another: Alk2 knockouts are normal, while half of Alk3 knockouts show failed regression similar to Amh null mutants.

=== Non-AMH ===
When AMH is absent, regression does not occur. In this case, WNT7A from the MDE encourages the location-specific expression of HOXA10 and HOXA11, which specifies the development of the uterus and cervix, in the MDM. Two additional Hox genes, HoxA9 and HoxA13, specify the development of the Fallopian tube and the upper vagina. The expression of these Hox genes depend on WNT5A being expressed. WNT4 remains required for further uterine development.

== Function ==
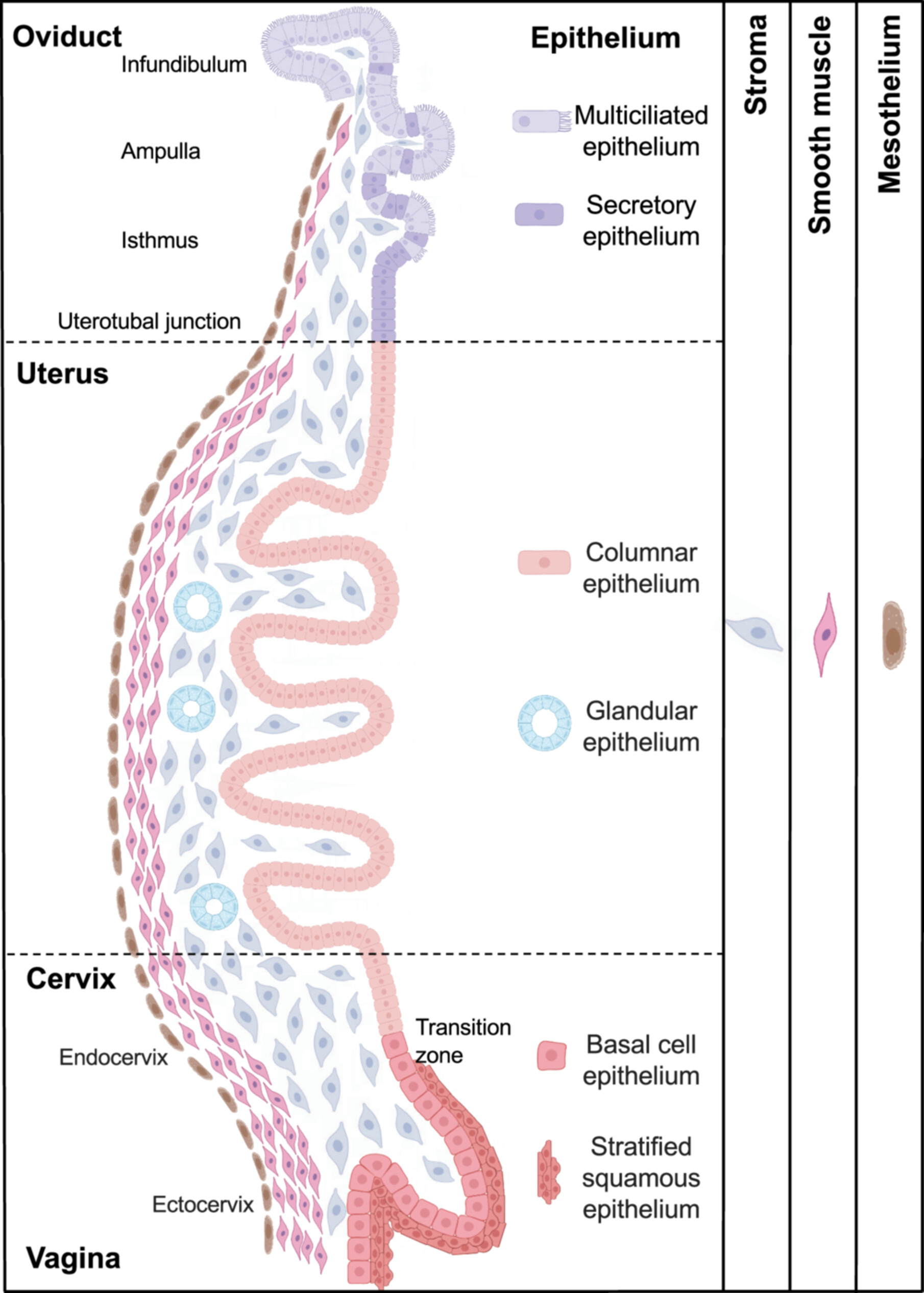
Types of epithelium throughout female reproductive tract

In females, the paramesonephric ducts give rise to the fallopian tubes, uterus, and upper portion of the vagina, while the mesonephric ducts degenerate due to the absence of male androgens. In contrast, the paramesonephric ducts begin to proliferate and differentiate in a cranial-caudal progression to form the aforementioned structures. During this time, the single-layered paramesonephric duct epithelium differentiates into other structures, ranging from the ciliated columnar epithelium in the uterine tube to stratified squamous epithelium in the vagina.

The paramesonephric ducts and the mesonephric ducts share a majority of the same mesenchyme due to Hox gene expression. The genes expressed play a critical role in mediating the regional characterization of structures found along the cranial-caudal axis of the female reproductive tract.

== Clinical significance ==
=== Mutations in AMH ===
Individuals that are 46, XY and have been tested positive for mutations in their AMH or AMH receptor genes have been known to exhibit features typical of that which are exhibited in persistent Müllerian duct syndrome due to the fact that the paramesonephric ducts fail to regress. When this happens the individuals develop structures that are derived from the paramesonephric duct, and also structures that are derived from the mesonephric duct. A male that has persistent Müllerian duct syndrome may have an upper vagina, uterus, and uterine tubes as well as ductus deferens along with male external genitalia. The female organs are in the correct anatomical position but the position of the testis varies. 60% to 70% of detected cases, both testes will lie in the normal position for the ovaries; about 20% to 30% of the time, one of the testis will lie within the inguinal hernial sac while in other cases both testes will lie within the same inguinal hernia sac. However whenever an individual exhibits persistent Müllerian duct syndrome, the ductus deferens will run along the lateral sides of the uterus.

=== Paramesonephric duct anomalies ===
Anomalies that develop within the paramesonephric duct system continue to puzzle and fascinate obstetricians and gynecologists. The paramesonephric ducts play a critical role in the female reproductive tract and differentiate to form the uterine tubes, uterus, superior vagina as well as the uterine cervix. Many types of disorders can occur when this system is disrupted ranging from uterine and vaginal agenesis to the duplication of unwanted cells of the uterus and vagina. Paramesonephric malformations are usually related to abnormalities of the renal and axial skeletal system. Malfunction in the ovaries and age onset abnormalities can also be associated with most paramesonephric ducts. Most often, abnormalities are recognized once the external genitalia is no longer masked and the internal reproductive organ abnormalities become revealed. Due to a very broad range of anomalies it is very difficult to diagnose paramesonephric duct anomalies.

Due to improved surgical instruments and technique, women with paramesonephric duct anomalies can have normal sexual relations. Through the use of Vecchietti and Mclndoe procedures, women can carry out their sexual activity. On another note, many other surgical advances have tremendously improved fertility chances as well as obstetric outcomes. Assisted reproductive technology makes it possible for some women who have paramesonephric duct anomalies to conceive and give birth to healthy babies.

== History ==
They are named after Johannes Peter Müller, a physiologist who described these ducts in his book Bildungsgeschichte der Genitalien in 1830.

== See also ==
- Defeminization
- Prostatic utricle
- Sexual differentiation
