= Urogenital sinus =

Part of mammalian embryo

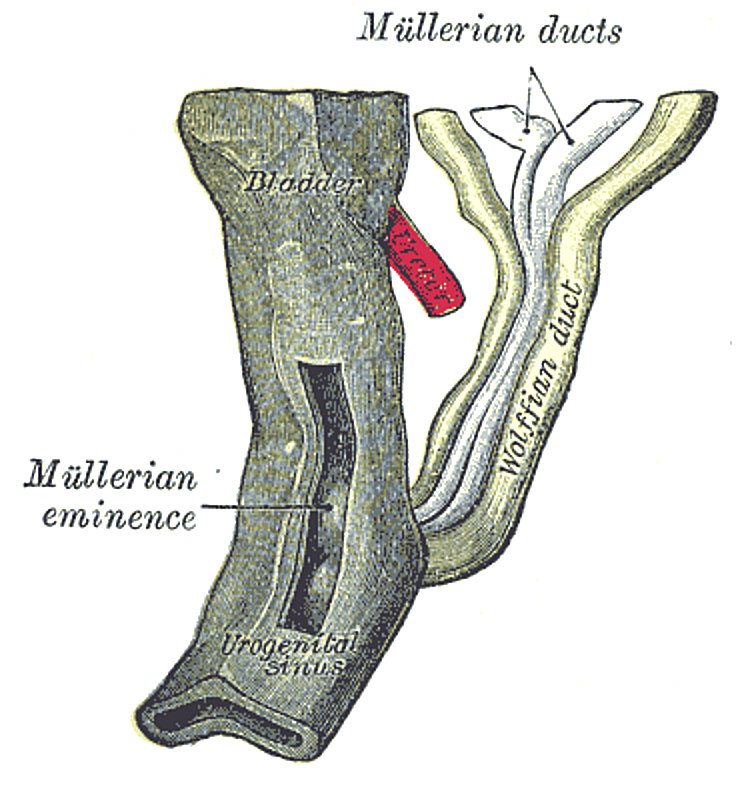
- Urogenital sinus of female human embryo of eight and a half to nine weeks old, with urogenital sinus labeled at bottom

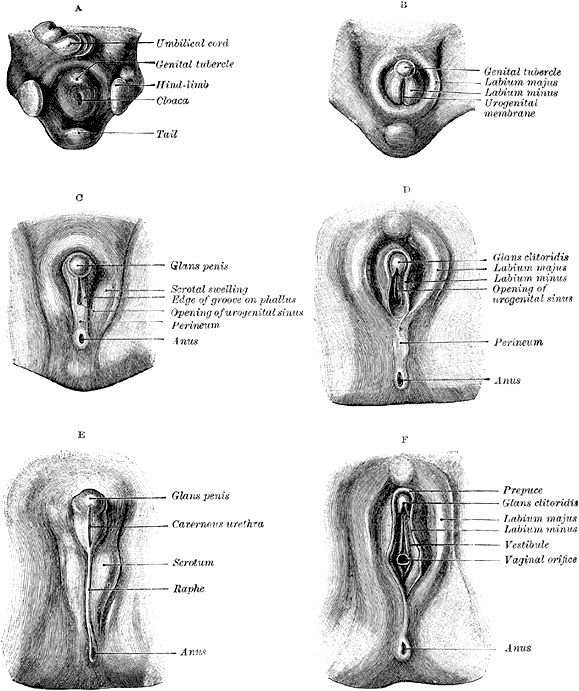
- Stages in the development of the external sexual organs in the male and female, with opening of urogenital sinus labeled in diagram D

Details
- Carnegie stage: 15
- Precursor: Cloaca
- Gives rise to: Urethra, bladder, vagina, vulval vestibule, Bartholin's glands, Skene's glands, prostate, bulbourethral glands

Identifiers
- Latin: sinus urogenitalis definitivus
- TE: sinus_by_E5.7.3.1.0.0.1 E5.7.3.1.0.0.1

The urogenital sinus is a body part of a human or other placental only present in the development of the urinary and reproductive organs. It is the ventral part of the cloaca, formed after the cloaca separates from the anal canal during the fourth to seventh weeks of development.

In males, the UG sinus is divided into three regions: upper, pelvic, and phallic. The upper part gives rise to the urinary bladder and the pelvic part gives rise to the prostatic and membranous parts of the urethra, the prostate and the bulbourethral glands (Cowper's). The phallic portion gives rise to the spongy (bulbar) part of the urethra and the urethral glands (Littré's).

In females, the pelvic part of the UG sinus gives rise to the sinovaginal bulbs, structures that will eventually form the inferior two thirds of the vagina. This process begins when the lower tip of the paramesonephric ducts, the structures that will eventually form the uterus and vaginal fornices, come in contact with the UG sinus. Shortly afterwards, the sinovaginal bulbs form as two solid evaginations of the UG sinus. Cells in these bulbs divide to form a solid vaginal plate, which extends and then canalizes (hollows) to form the inferior portion of the vagina. The female urogenital sinus also gives rise to the urethra, vestibule, Skene's glands and Bartholin's glands.

== Clinical significance ==
=== Persistent urogenital sinus ===
A persistent urogenital sinus (often abbreviated to PUGS) is a rare birth defect in where the urethra and vaginal canal both open into a common channel. It can sometimes be a sign that someone has a disorder of sex development or that they are intersex.

A persistent urogenital sinus may be caused by masculinization of a female embryo, such as in congenital adrenal hyperplasia, or a result of other non-masculinizing conditions like cloacal exstrophy or persistent cloaca.

Cases of what are sometimes labelled extreme hypospadias in males can also sometimes involve a persistent urogenital sinus when severe under-masculinization of a male results in partial masculinization with vestigial vaginal remnants or a blind ending vaginal pouch, such as in androgen insensitivity syndrome, 5α-Reductase 2 deficiency, and other 46,XY disorders of sex development.

=== Persistent cloaca ===
A persistent cloaca is a disorder where the rectum, vagina, and urinary tract fail to separate during development and instead meet in a single common channel, creating a cloaca.

=== Related images ===
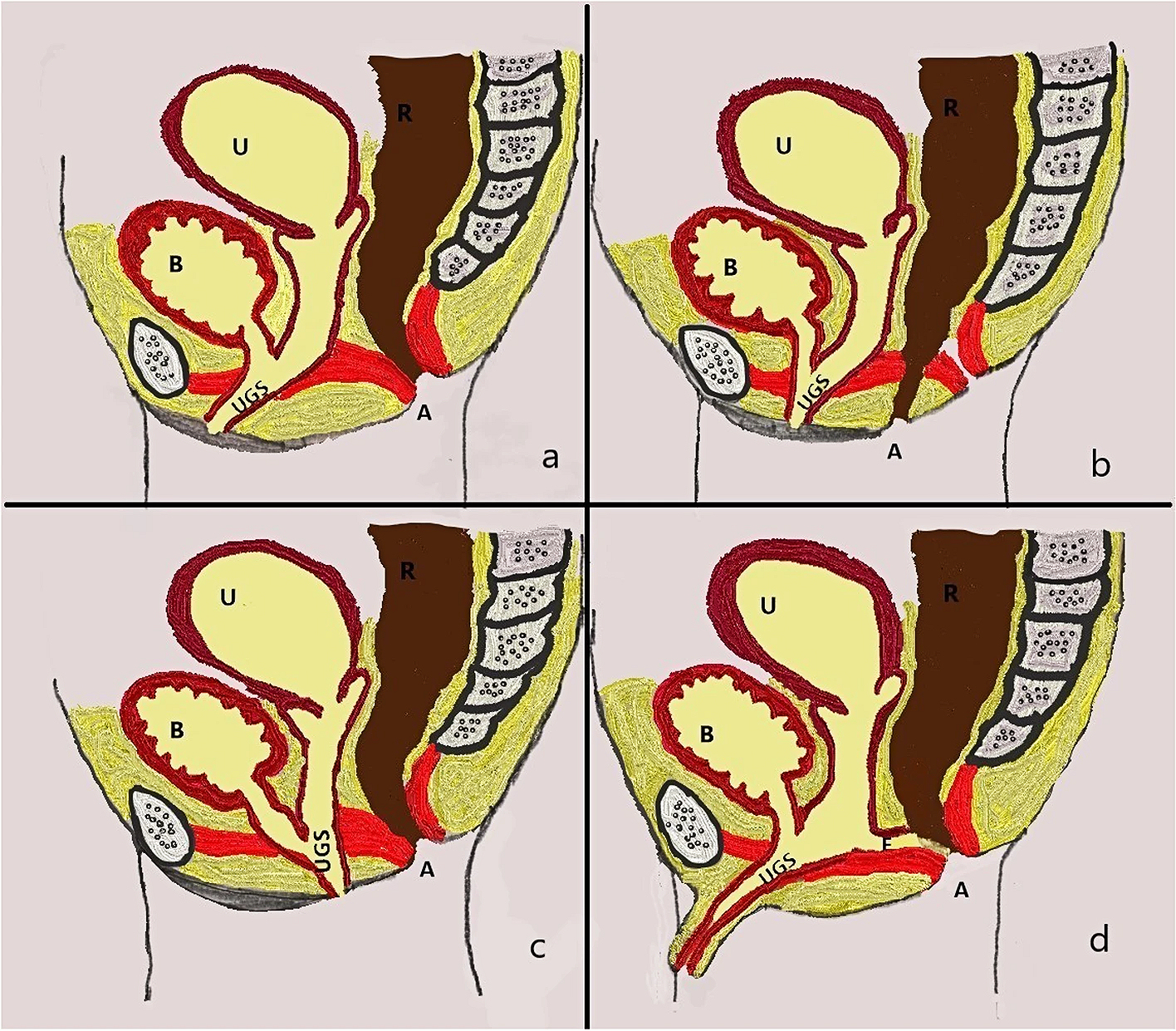

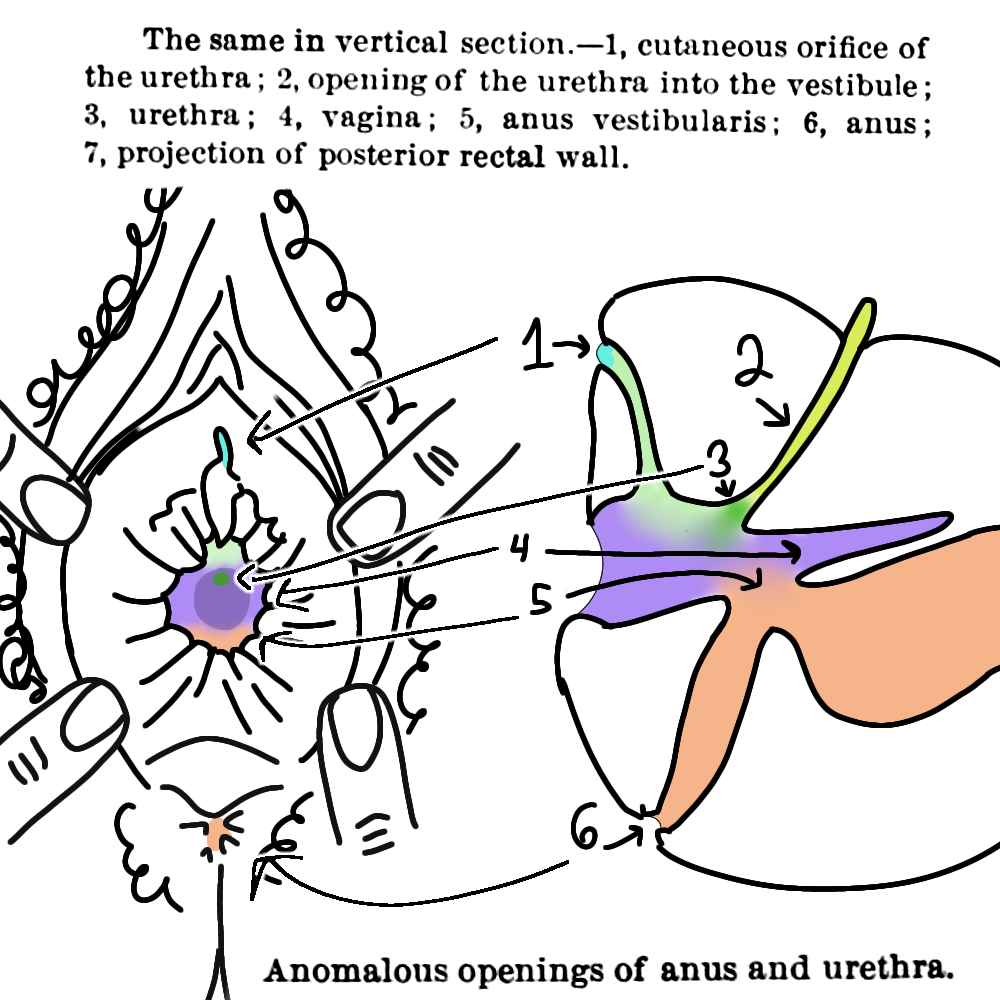

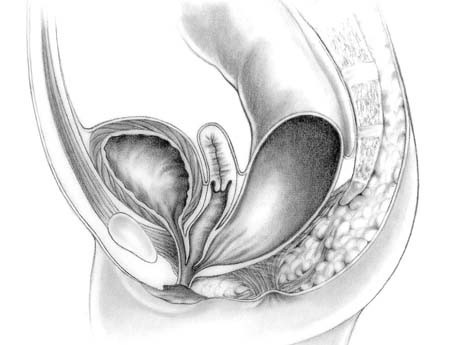

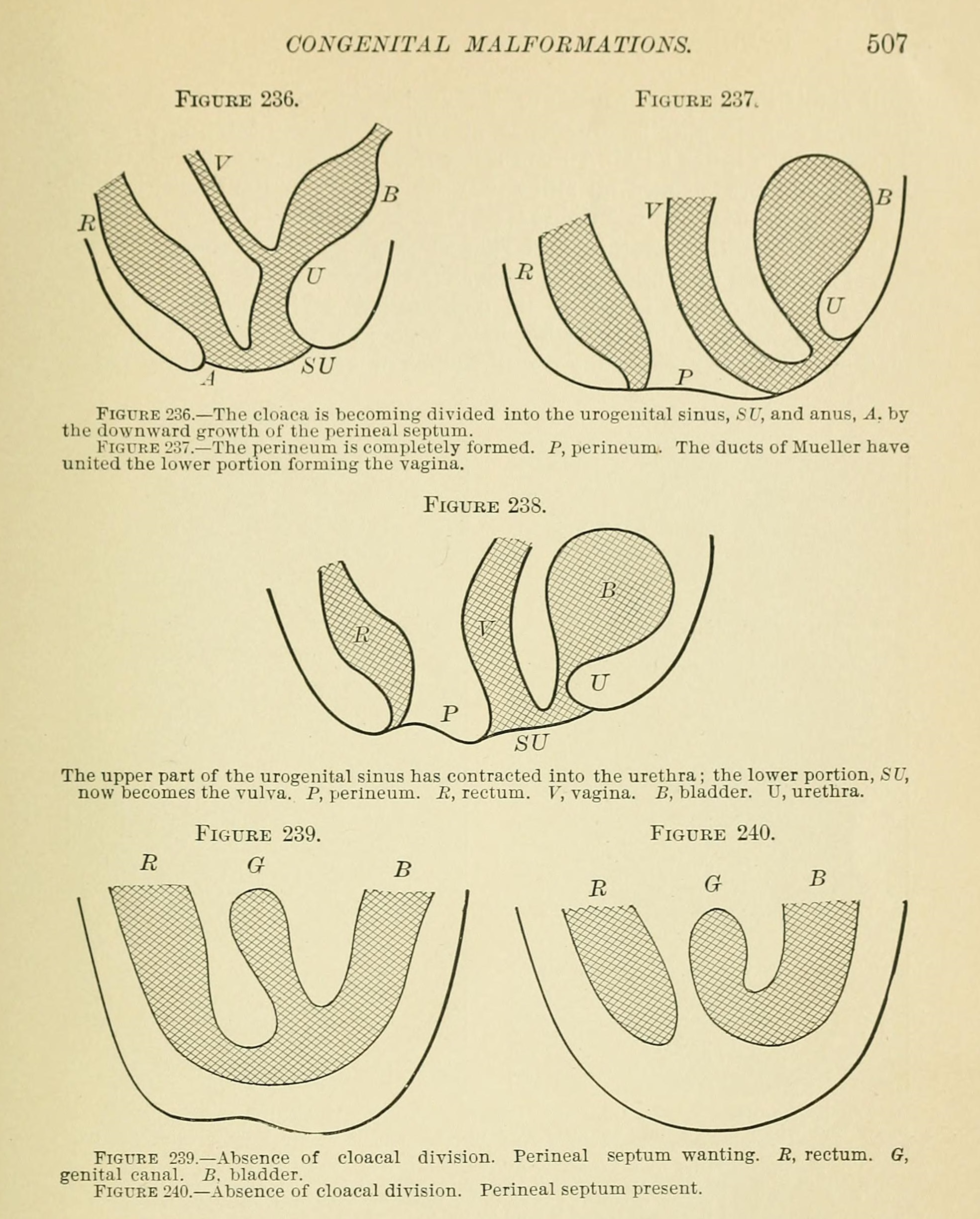

== Other animals ==
In many mammals (excluding homonids and some rodents), the urogenital sinus refers to the sinus in which the openings to the female's urethra and vagina are found. However, this term may also apply to some male mammals.

== Additional images ==
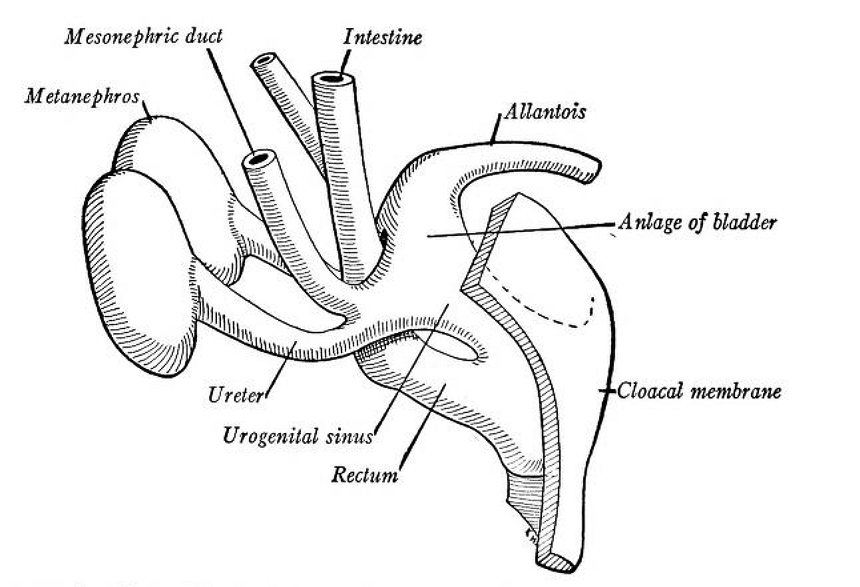
Human embryo showing the partial subdivision of the cloaca into rectum and urogenital sinus.

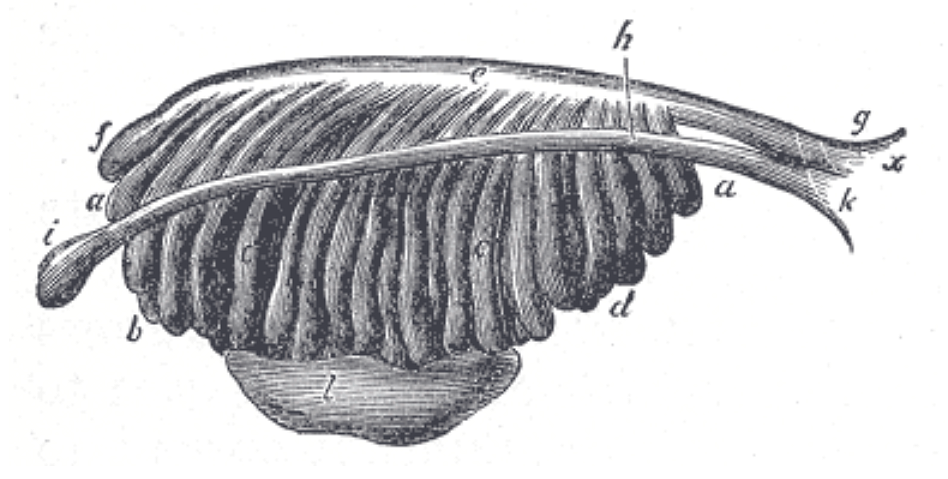
Enlarged view from the front of the left Wolffian body before the establishment of the distinction of sex.

== See also ==
- Cloaca
- Genitography
- Hypospadias
- Epispadias
- Disorders of sex development
- Sexual differentiation
- List of homologues of the human reproductive system
