= Mesonephric duct =

Paired organ of the urogenital system in mammals

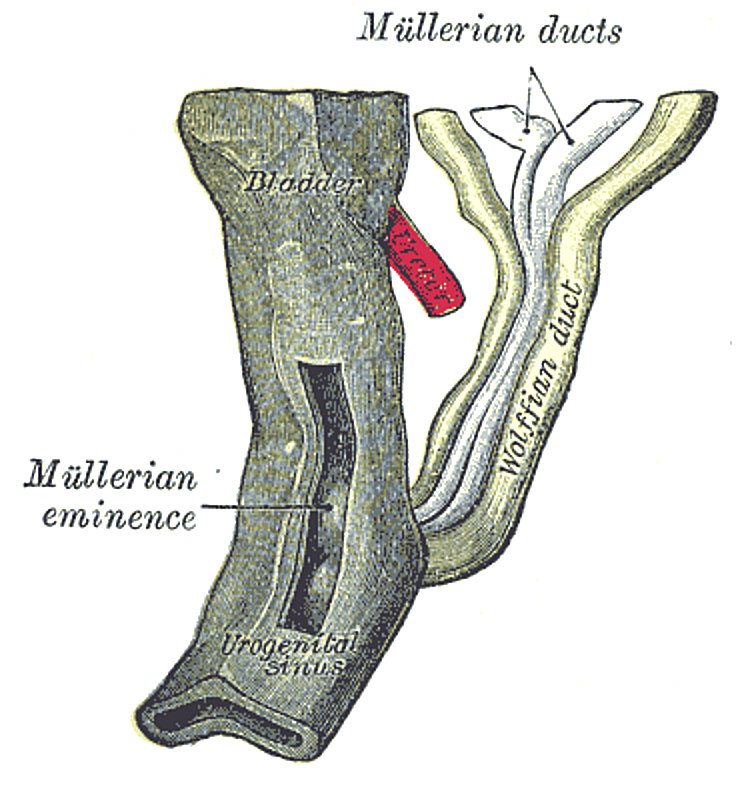
- Urogenital sinus of female human embryo of eight and a half to nine weeks old

Details
- Carnegie stage: 11
- Days: 28
- Precursor: Intermediate mesoderm
- Gives rise to: Vasa deferentia, seminal vesicles, epididymides, Gartner's duct

Identifiers
- Latin: ductus mesonephricus; ductus Wolffi
- MeSH: D014928
- TE: duct_by_E5.6.2.0.0.0.4 E5.6.2.0.0.0.4

The mesonephric duct, also known as the Wolffian duct, archinephric duct, Leydig's duct or nephric duct, is a paired organ that develops in the early stages of embryonic development in humans and other mammals. It is an important structure that plays a critical role in the formation of male reproductive organs. The term Wolffian duct is named after Caspar Friedrich Wolff, a German physiologist and embryologist who first described it in his dissertation in 1759.

During embryonic development, the mesonephric ducts form as a part of the urogenital system.

== Structure ==
The mesonephric duct connects the primitive kidney, the mesonephros, to the cloaca. It also serves as the primordium for male urogenital structures including the epididymides, vasa deferentia, and seminal vesicles.

== Development ==
The mesonephric duct typically forms around the 3rd-4th week of pregnancy, before the paramesonephric duct (also known as the Müllerian duct).

In both males and females, the mesonephric duct develops into the trigone of urinary bladder, a part of the bladder wall, and also produces WNT9B, which is required for the elongation of the paramesonephric duct.

=== Male ===
In a male, it develops into a system of connected organs between the efferent ducts of the testis and the prostate, namely the epididymis, the vas deferens, and the seminal vesicle. The prostate forms from the urogenital sinus and the efferent ducts form from the mesonephric tubules.

For this, it is critical that the duct is exposed to testosterone during embryogenesis. Testosterone binds to and activates androgen receptor, affecting intracellular signals and modifying the expression of numerous genes.

In a mature male, the function of this system is to store and mature sperm, and provide accessory semen fluid.

=== Female ===
In a female, with the absence of anti-Müllerian hormone secretion by the Sertoli cells and subsequent Müllerian apoptosis, the mesonephric duct regresses, although inclusions may persist. The vestigial epoophoron arises from this duct. Also, lateral to the wall of the vagina, a Gartner's duct could develop as a remnant. Normal regression starts with the action of COUP-TFII in the Wolffian mesenchyme.

The mesenchyme of the mesonephric duct is retained in female reproductive tissue after sexual differentiation. As the mesonephric ducts regress, they undergo significant chromatin remodeling and move to surround the paramesonephric duct. Cells from the Wolffian mesenchyme occur in a layer around the inner epithelium, where the Müllerian mesenchyme cells also reside. The two can be distinguished by their gene expression profile: cells derived from the Wolffian mesenchyme expresses AR, while those from the Müllerian mesenchyme expresses AMHR2. Both types of mesenchyme become smooth muscle and fibroblasts. They appear quite evenly mixed in the oviduct, but remain clearly separated in the uterus, with the Wolffian mesenchyme settling in the mesometrial side.

== Additional images ==
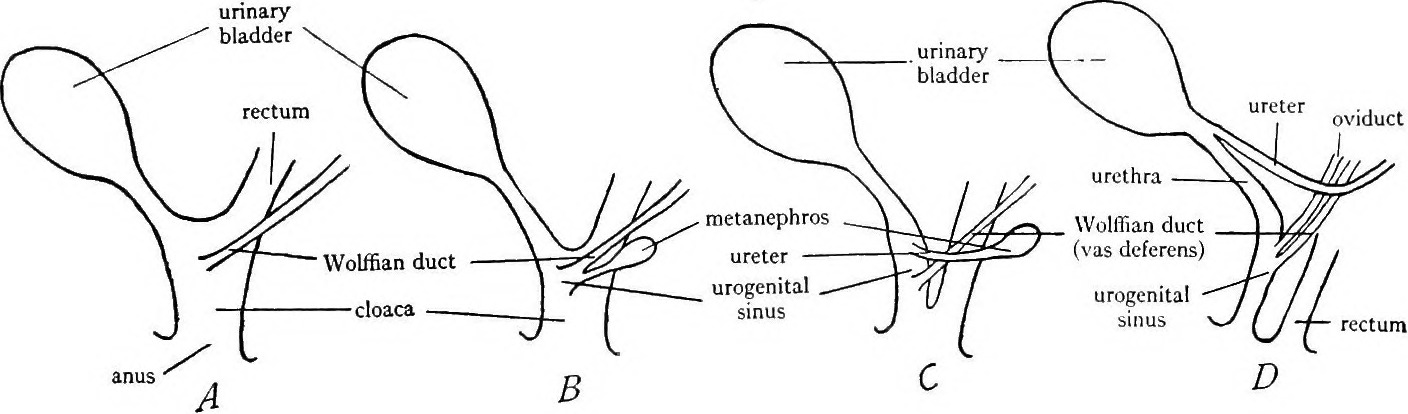
Diagrams to illustrate the changes in the cloaca in mammals during development. A, early embryonic stage, showing the cloaca receiving the urinary bladder, the rectum, and the mesonephric duct, as in the lower vertebrates. B, later stage, showing the beginning of the fold which divides the cloaca into a ventral urogenital sinus which receives the urinary bladder, mesonephric duct, and ureters, and into a dorsal part which receives the rectum. C, further progress of the fold, dividing the cloaca into urogenital sinus and rectum; the ureter has separated from the mesonephric duct and is shifting anteriorly. D, completion of the fold, showing complete separation of the cloaca into ventral urogenital sinus and dorsal rectum.

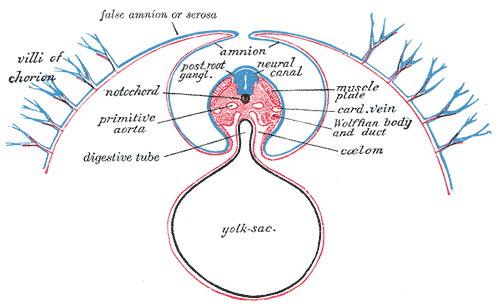
Diagram of a transverse section, showing the mode of formation of the amnion in the chick

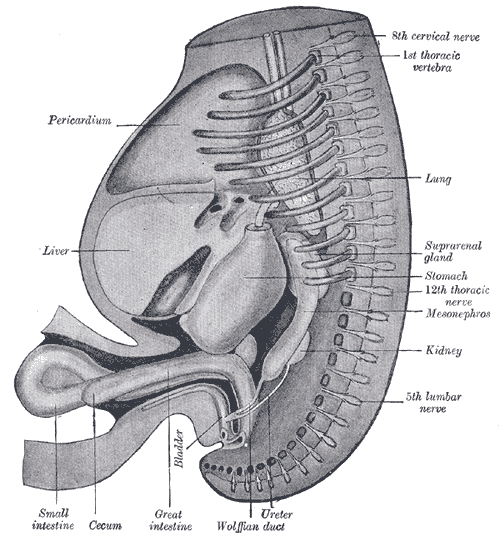
Reconstruction of a human embryo of 17 mm

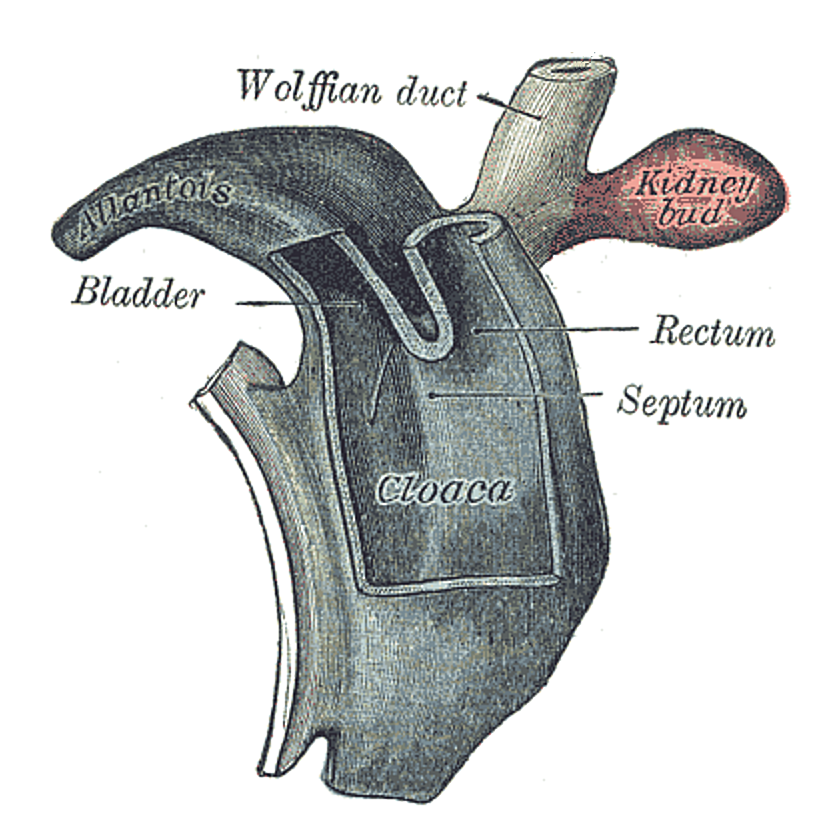
Cloaca of human embryo from twenty-five to twenty-seven days old

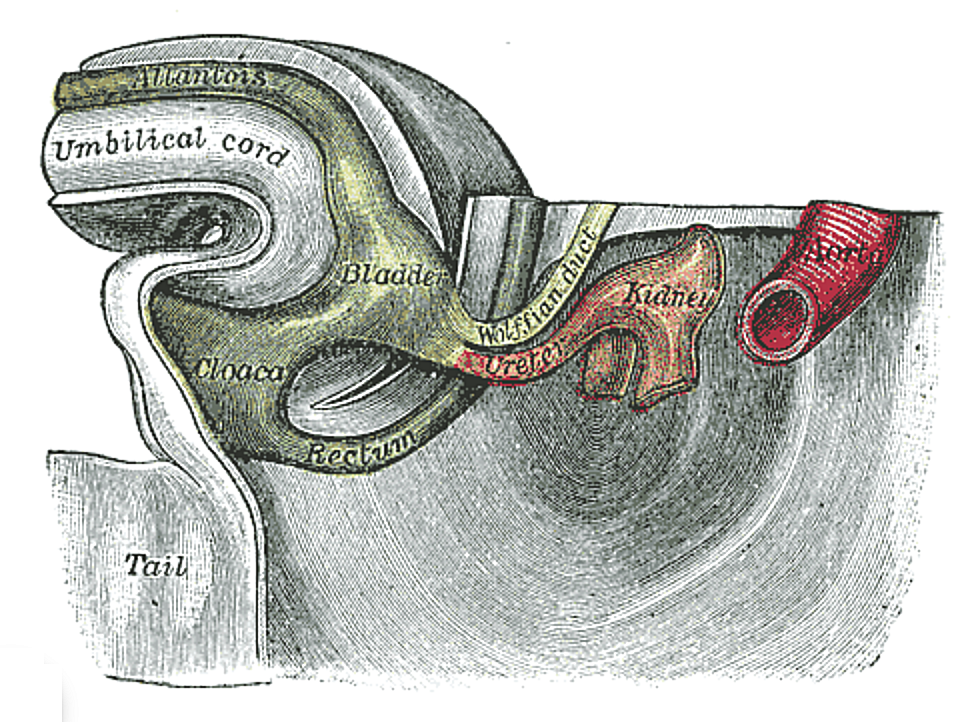
Tail end of human embryo thirty-two to thirty-three days old

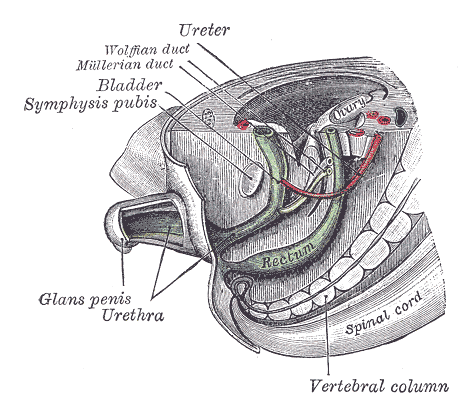
Tail end of human embryo; from eight and a half to nine weeks old

== See also ==
- Fetal genital development
- List of homologues of the human reproductive system
- Masculinization
- Paramesonephric duct
- Sexual differentiation
