= High-grade serous carcinoma =

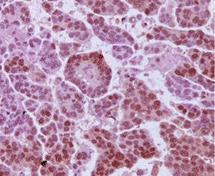
- Immunohistochemistry micrograph of androgen receptors on a HGSC tumour sample

High-grade serous carcinoma (HGSC) is a type of tumour that arises from the serous epithelial layer in the abdominopelvic cavity and is mainly found in the ovary. HGSCs make up the majority of ovarian cancer cases and have the lowest survival rates. HGSC is distinct from low-grade serous carcinoma (LGSC) which arises from ovarian tissue, is less aggressive and is present in stage I ovarian cancer where tumours are localised to the ovary.

Although originally thought to arise from the squamous epithelial cell layer covering the ovary, HGSC is now thought to originate in the Fallopian tube epithelium. HGSC is much more invasive than LGSC with a higher fatality rate - although it is more sensitive to platinum-based chemotherapy, possibly due to its rapid growth rate. In rare cases, HGSCs can develop from LGSCs, but generally the two types arise independently of each other.

== Risk factors ==
=== Environmental risk factors ===
The 'incessant ovulation' theory is suggested by the strong correlation between the number of ovulatory cycles of an individual and their risk of ovarian cancer.

This trend is reflected in the protective effects of pregnancy, parity and breastfeeding against ovarian cancer, and similar findings in epidemiological studies that have indicated a reduction of risk associated with use of oral contraceptive pills.

Ovulation is accepted as the cause of ovarian cortical inclusion cysts, the precursor lesions of serous carcinomas, and lower numbers of these cortical inclusion cysts are thought to be the mechanism by which reducing lifetime ovulations can lower the risk of developing HGSC.

Conversely, a temporal association with menopausal hormone therapy and incidence of HGSC was found, and polyendocrine metabolic ovarian syndrome (PMOS) was shown to contribute to a doubling of the risk of ovarian cancer.

Endometriosis can increase risk for other ovarian cancer subtypes, but is not associated with HGSC.

=== Genetic risk factors ===
More than 20% of ovarian cancer tumours have hereditary origin. The majority of these feature mutations in the tumour suppressor BRCA genes, which tend to give rise to HGSC. A mutation in BRCA1 or BRCA2 can confer a lifetime ovarian cancer risk of 40-50% and 10-20% respectively, with BRCA2 mutations strongly associated with better clinical outcomes.

A specific tumour protein 53 (TP53) expression pattern in the Fallopian tube epithelium – the 'p53 signature' - is thought to be a precursor marker of HGSC. TP53-/- mice (in which the TP53 gene has been deleted) do not develop ovarian carcinomas. However, TP53 mutations were found in 96% of HGSC cases. A local abnormal TP53 expression may thus be indicative of HGSC. In women, pelvic HGSC show either a complete absence of P53 expression, or overexpression, suggesting that any aberration of P53 leads to tumour development. Additionally, overexpression of TP53 is associated with better clinical outcome whereas an absence of the p53 protein is linked to an increased risk of HGSC tumour recurrence.

A recent mouse model suggest that a p53 mutation may induce HGSC arising from the ovary rather than the Fallopian tube.

== Pathophysiology ==
=== Cell origin ===
HGSC are further distinguished from LGSC by 'type I/II' ovarian tumour nomenclature; type I referring to tumour types (e.g. LGSCs) where precursor lesions within the ovary have been characterised, and type II referring to tumour types (e.g. HGSCs) without association of such lesions, tumours understood to develop de novo from the tubal and/or ovarian surface epithelium. This classification has more relevance to research rather than to clinical practice.

The serous membrane is a particular type of secretory epithelium which covers organs in body cavities and secretes serous fluid to reduce friction from muscle movement. Serous membrane lining the abdominopelvic cavity is called the peritoneum; that lining heart and mediastinum is the pericardium, and that lining the thoracic cavity and lungs is the pleura. Technically a 'serous carcinoma' can occur anywhere on these membranes, but high-grade serous carcinoma is generally limited to the peritoneal area.

While until recently HGSC was thought to arise from simple differentiation of cortical inclusion cysts (CICs) of ovarian surface epithelium (OSE), the cell origin of HGSC is now understood to be much more complex, with evidence for other sites of origin, both intra- and extra-ovarian, having come to light.

Tissue	Evidence for role as HGSC cell of origin
Ovary	Supporting: 1. Metastatic HGSC arose in the ovaries of mouse triple knockouts of p53, PTEN and Dicer in which the Fallopian tubes had been removed, as well as in double murine knockouts of PTEN and p53 with intact Fallopian tubes.; 2. The stem-cell-rich hilum region of the ovarian surface epithelium is a cancer-prone area.; Opposing: 1. A convincing precursor of HGSC in the ovary has not yet been identified.
Coelomic epithelium	Supporting: 'Coelomic hypothesis': 1. Due to the embryological relationship between the coelomic epithelium and the Müllerian ducts, the coelomic epithelium is predisposed to differentiation via Müllerian metaplasia into the different epithelial tumour tissue types (e.g. serous, endometrioid, clear cell and mucinous). Cortical inclusion cysts of the OSE can thus undergo differentiation into neoplasms.; 2. This hypothesis can account for primary peritoneal carcinomas by implying that extra-ovarian coelomic epithelium can similarly undergo Müllerian metaplasia.; Opposing: 1. There has so far been an absence of precursor lesions of ovarian carcinomas on the OSE despite extensive histopathology.
Fallopian tube	Supporting: 1. Precursor lesions (serous tubal intraepithelial carcinomas or 'STICs') found on the fimbrial ends of the Fallopian tube of BRCA 1/2 women. Detection of early cancers in the fimbria has increased with the application of the SEE-FIM Protocol that carefully examines the distal portion of the tube.; 2. There is physical contact between the fimbriae and the ovary during ovulation (supports 'incessant ovulation' hypothesis).; 3. The fringes of the fimbriae come into contact with the pro-inflammatory follicular fluid.; 4. Identical TP53 mutations in STIC and concurrent HGSC were reported, suggesting a clonal relationship.; 5. In the triple p53-PTEN-Dicer knockout mice earlier mentioned, where the Fallopian tubes were intact, HGSC arose from the tubes 100% of the time, eclipsing the tumourgenicity of the ovary. Identical findings were found from PTEN-Dicer knockouts.; 6. A 2012 clinical trial of a screening technique found that 7 out of 9 identified HGSC cases arose from the Fallopian tube fimbriae 7. Transfer of transformed serous Fallopian tube secretory epithelium into the peritoneum of severe combined immunodeficiency (SCID) mice induced tumours which resemble human HGSC.; 8. Reliable HGSC precursors were found on the Fallopian tubes in the form of abnormal TP53 expression patterns.; 9. Serous fimbrial cells are less able to correct DNA damage and reverse mutations than their ciliated counterparts, indicating how they might be particularly vulnerable to the mutagenicity of the follicular fluid at ovulation.; Opposing: 1. A 2013 study shows that STICs only advance to form HGSC in the presence of a BRCA mutation, remaining uninvasive in models without such mutations – suggesting that HGSCs may arise from Fallopian tube tissue in individuals with BRCA mutations, but not generally.
Extra-uterine Müllerian epithelium (EUME)	All epithelia of the female genital tract – Fallopian tubes, endometrium, endocervix, ectocervix, upper vagina - are derived from the embryonal Müllerian ducts. Extra-uterine Müllerian epithelium includes the distal end of the Fallopian tubes (the fimbriae), and instances of endosalpingiosis, endometriosis and endocervicosis. Supporting: 1. High-grade serous extra-uterine carcinomas have been reported.; 2. Intraovarian Müllerian cysts can be explained as examples of endosalpingiosis within the ovary, rather than as results of Müllerian metaplasia in pre-existing cortical inclusion cysts as per the coelomic hypothesis.; 3. This hypothesis can also account for primary peritoneal carcinomas, as EUME can be found far away enough from the ovary and fimbriae to give rise to tumors without input from those organs.; 4. The extensiveness of EUME can also explain the presence of paratubal and paraovarian tumours.; 5. Endosalpingiosis - a condition where Fallopian tube epithelium is found outside the Fallopian tube - supports the likelihood of HGSC arising in the wider peritoneum.; 6. Endosalpingiosis is associated with high incidence of borderline serous carcinoma (38%) and HGSC (18%).; 7. A central role of EUME in HGS carcinogenesis would account for cases of HGSC that do not involve precursor STICs.; Opposing: 1. This is a relatively new hypothesis and requires further research using appropriate models before conclusions can be drawn.
Border between ovary and Fallopian tube (transition zone)	Supporting: 1. Transition zones in other epithelia are frequent sites of stem cells.; 2. Such an epithelial transition zone may have more ambiguous stem cell fate signalling, and thus may be vulnerable to carcinogenesis.; 3. A number of epithelial transition zones, e.g. ectocervix junction, gastro-duodenal junction, are implicated in the development of different epithelial cancers.; Opposing: 1. This is a relatively new hypothesis and requires further research using appropriate models before conclusions can be drawn.

The common Müllerian origin of the Fallopian tubes, uterus, cervix, and upper vagina has resulted in the proposal that peritoneal high-grade serous carcinoma is a spectrum of a single disease.

Relevant animal models of HGSC can only be developed when the cell origin is properly understood. However, as HGSC tends to have the same clinical behaviour, regardless of its primary cell origin, determining cell origin is less important for clinical treatment, but may be of relevance when looking for biomarkers.

The specific process by which a HGSC arises may be related to the BRCA mutation status of the individual, as well as the p53 mutation status.

A 2007 paper describes the process of determining cell of origin as "Tumour origin is typically assigned to the organ presenting with the dominant tumour mass. The one exception is the peritoneum, which is classified as a primary site only if a candidate origin is not found in the endometrium, tube or ovary".

It is recognised that HGSC can have variable and complex primary origins, but understanding and determining this will give insight into its pathogenesis.

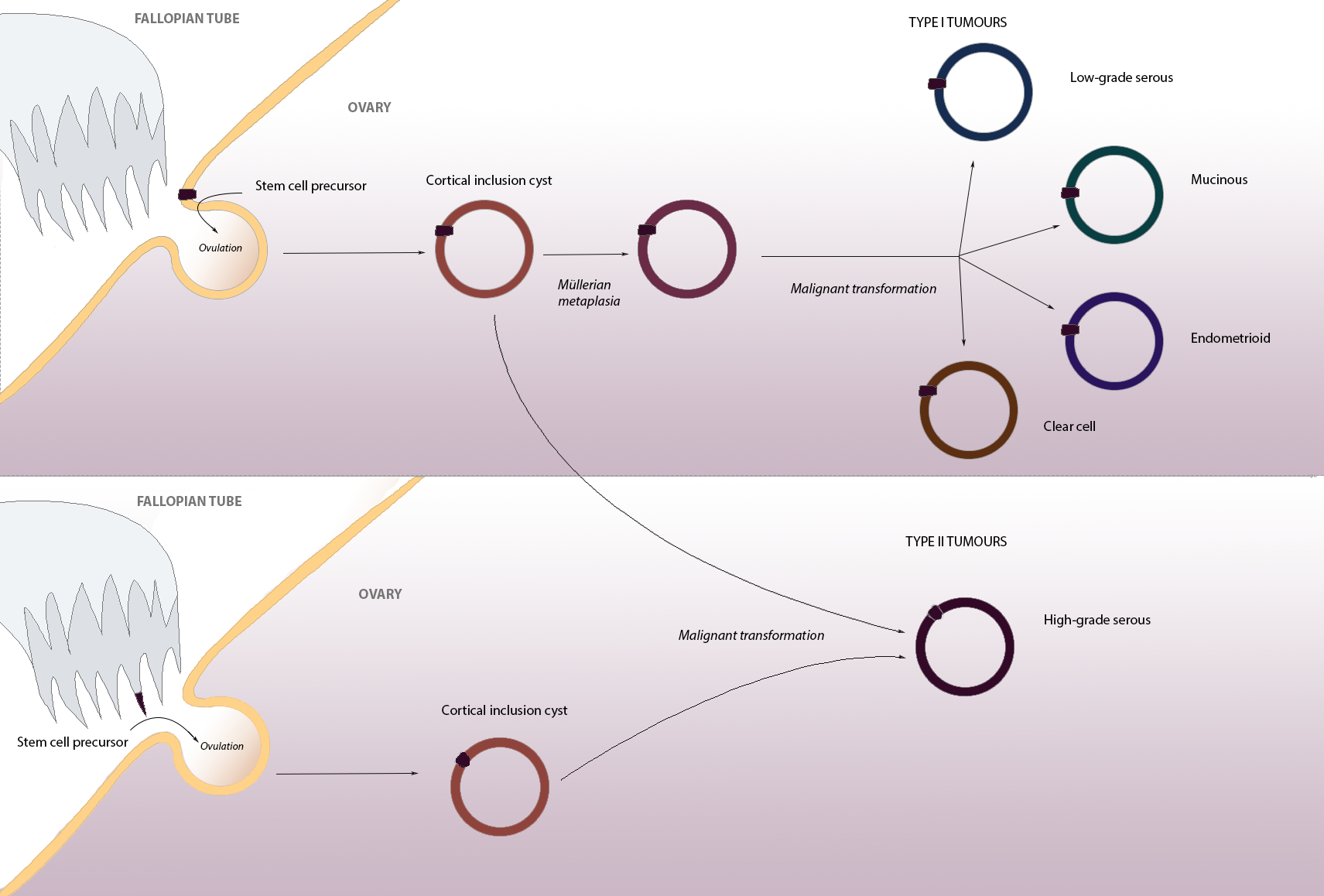
Diagram of HGSC theories of origin

=== Pathogenesis ===
Assuming a fimbrial origin, as observed in the majority of HGSC cases, the current understanding of HGSC genesis suggests a process by which STIC fimbrial cells implant into the ovary as cortical inclusion cysts through the ovulation rupture site.

To account for instances where there is no STIC involvement, endosalpingiosis or de novo metaplasia of ovarian surface epithelium inclusions are also possible. A much rarer occurrence is the differentiation of HGSC from LGSC.

== Diagnosis ==
Symptoms include persistent bloating, postmenopausal bleeding, and/or appetite loss.

Transvaginal ultrasonography as well as cancer marker CA125 level analysis is often used to determine potential malignancy of suspect pelvic masses.

Surgical staging is the procedure by which the abdominal cavity and lymph nodes are examined for malignant tissue, usually via laparoscopy. Tissue biopsies may be taken for further analysis. It is not until this histological analysis stage that actual diagnosis of HGSC can be made.

If glands are seen to fuse with intricate, extensive papillae featuring epithelial tufting with solid nests surrounded by a space alongside irregular slit-like spaces, then serous carcinoma is suspected.

Distinguishing between LGSC and HGSC:

1. Necrosis is common in HGSC and absent in LGSC, as are giant (multi- or mononucleated) tumour cells.
2. Psammoma bodies are more frequent in low-grade serous carcinoma.
3. Tp53 expression is assessed for mutations, overexpression or absence – common features of high-grade serous carcinomas.
4. LGSCs are generally limited to micropapillary growth patterns, whereas HGSCs can exhibit admixed patterns.

Distinction of HGSC from high-grade endometrioid carcinoma is not always possible.

The progression of HGSC may also be determined from examining the cadherin expression profile.

=== Screening ===
As ovarian cancer is rarely symptomatic until an advanced stage, regular pre-emptive screening is a particularly important tool for avoiding the late stage at which most patients present. However, A 2011 US study found that transvaginal ultrasound and cancer marker CA125 screening did not reduce ovarian cancer mortality. In contrast, a more recent UK study found that up to 20% of ovarian cancer deaths could be prevented through annual performance of these procedures.

== Prevention ==
Prevention for an individual deemed at risk of HGSC has, up until recently, been (bilateral or unilateral) removal of both the ovary and the Fallopian tube (salpingo-oophorectomy).

With hormonal and even morbidity issues resulting from ovary removal, and the increased evidence for the role of the Fallopian tubes HGSC pathogenesis, optimisation of this procedure has been to remove just the Fallopian tube(s) (salpingectomy) with the ovaries remaining until age of menopause - although critics of this argue that a reduced blood supply to the ovaries may induce premature menopause regardless.

Prophylactic salpingo-oophorectomy is frequently performed in carriers of BRCA1 or BRCA2 mutations, although the benefits conferred by this procedure may vary dependent on the specific mutation.

Tubal ligation is a less invasive prophylactic treatment shown to significantly reduce the risk of HGSC.

== Treatment ==
Cytoreductive "debulking" surgery may be performed prior to chemotherapy treatment in order to decrease the physical mass of the tumour and thus reduce the number of chemotherapy cycles needed. The typical advanced presentation as well as extra-ovarian spread seen in HGSC can require aggressive debulking procedures. In some cases total abdominal hysterectomy will be performed, in other cases where the patient intends to bear children a salpingo-oophorectomy is performed instead.

Typical chemotherapy is six cycles of intraperitoneally-delivered platinum-base adjuvant chemotherapy with agents such as carboplatin. Measurements of blood CA125 levels are used to determine patient response to the treatment.

Between 20% and 30% of patients relapse within six months of treatment.

Poly ADP ribose polymerase (PARP) inhibitors are another possible treatment, with carriers of BRCA1/2 mutations being the most responsive

== Epidemiology ==
A study of incidence rates in the US between 1992 and 1999 found that the age-specific incidence rate for HGSC doubles every 10 years up until age 55, where it plateaus at approximately 20 cases per 100,000 women - before dropping dramatically after age 75.

Ovarian cancer incidence rates are low in East Asia and highest in Europe, the United States, and Australia/New Zealand.

Since 1975, survival rates for ovarian cancer have steadily improved with a mean decrease of 51% by 2006 of risk of death from ovarian cancer for an advanced stage tumour. The increase has mainly been due to successful extended life expectancy of affected patients rather than an improvement in cure rates.

A racial disparity exists between black and white women in the US, where black women experience a higher mortality risk from ovarian cancer.
