= Male reproductive system =

Reproductive system of the human male

Male reproductive system (human)
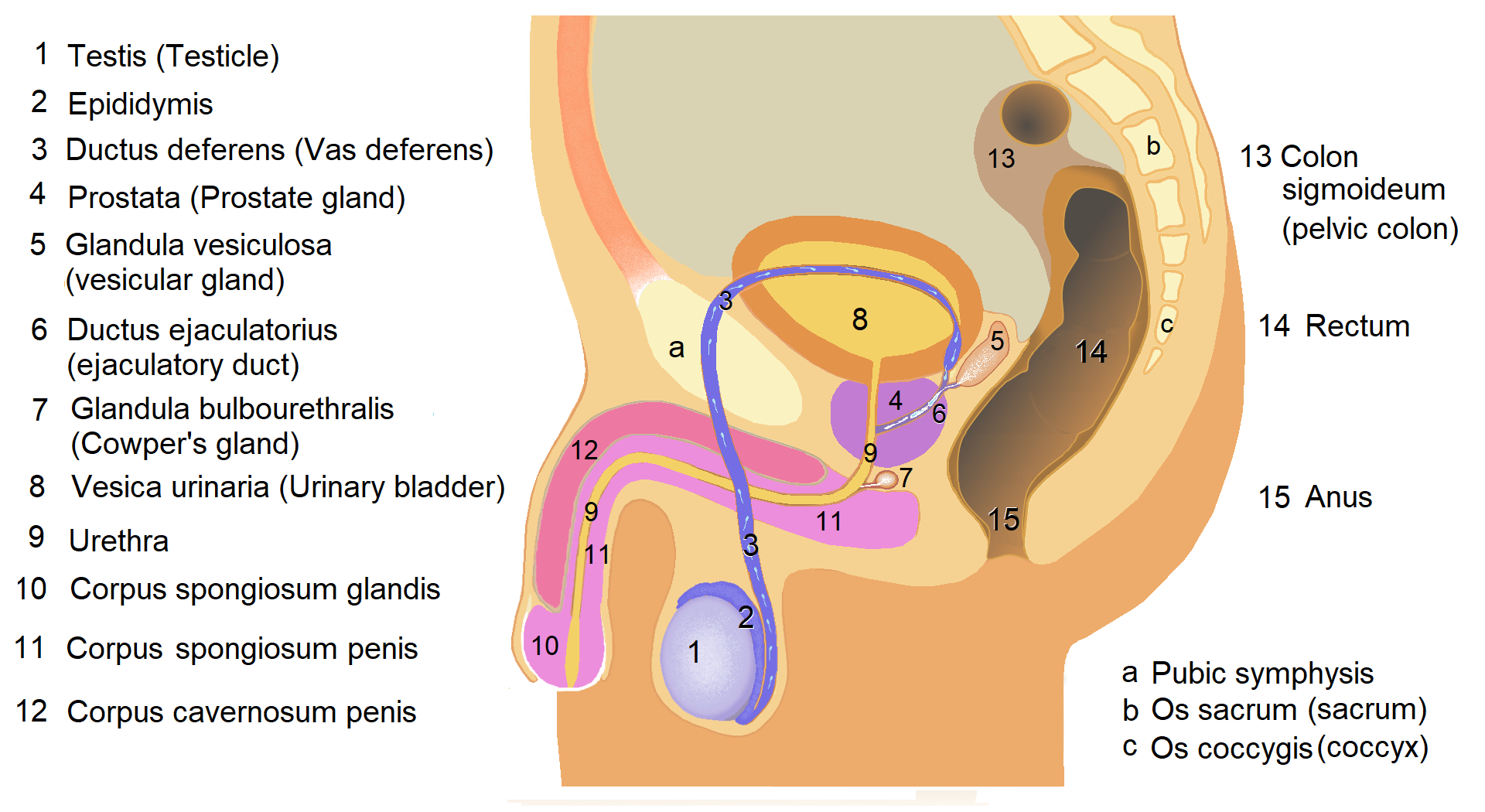
- Male reproductive system

Details

Identifiers
- Latin: systema genitale masculinum
- MeSH: D005837
- TA98: A09.0.00.002
- TA2: 3574
- FMA: 45664

The male reproductive system consists of a number of sex organs that play a role in the process of human reproduction. These organs are located on the outside of the body and within the pelvis.

The main male sex organs are the penis and the scrotum, which contains the testicles that produce semen and sperm, which, as part of sexual intercourse, fertilize an ovum in the female's body; the fertilized ovum (zygote) develops into a fetus,which is later born as an infant. The corresponding system in females is the female reproductive system.

== External genitalia ==
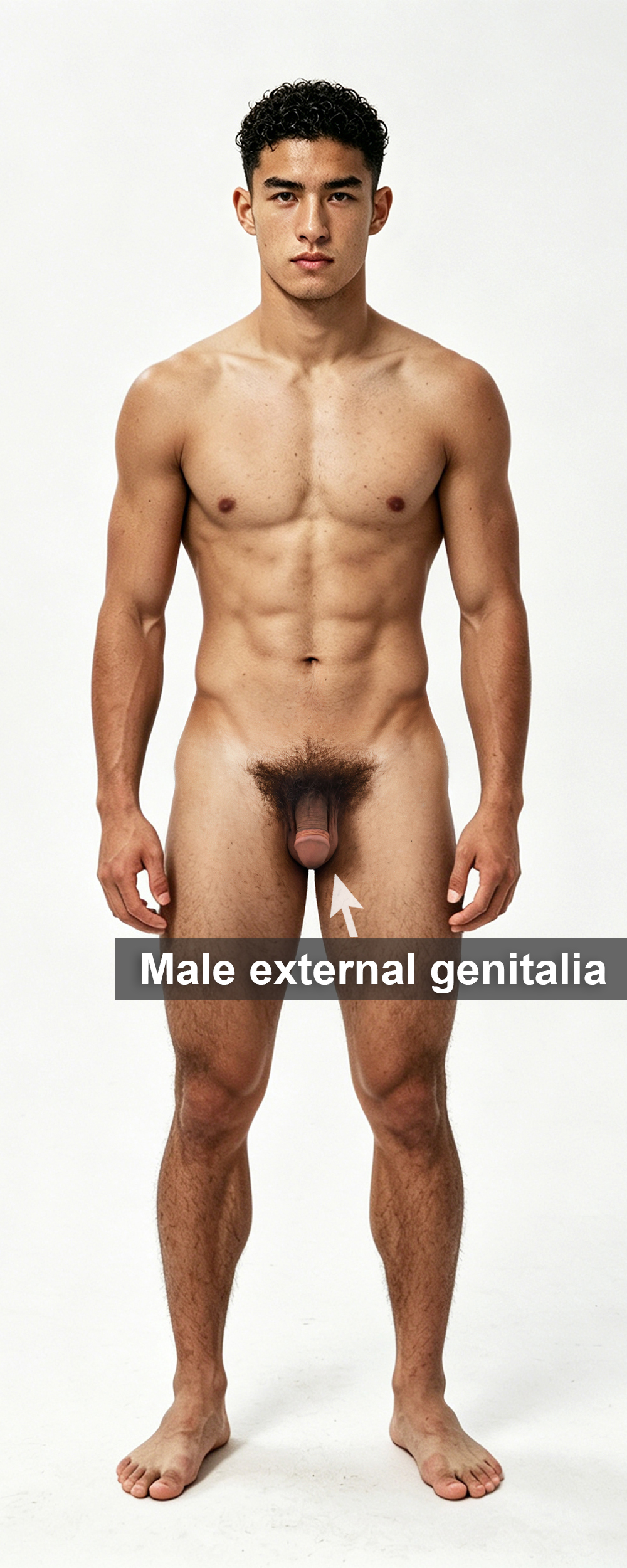
A frontal view of an adult male showing the anatomical location of the external genitalia (penis and scrotum) in the pubic region.

=== Penis ===
The penis is an intromittent organ with a long shaft, an enlarged bulbous-shaped tip called the glans and its foreskin for protection. Inside the penis is the urethra, which is used to ejaculate semen and to excrete urine. Both substances exit through the meatus.

When a male becomes sexually aroused, erection occurs because sinuses within the erectile tissues of the penis (corpora cavernosa and corpus spongiosum) become filled with blood. The arteries of the penis are dilated while the veins are compressed so that blood flows into the erectile cartilage under pressure. The penis is supplied by the pudendal artery.

=== Scrotum ===
The scrotum is a sac of skin that hangs behind the penis. It holds and protects the testicles. It also contains numerous nerves and blood vessels. During times of lower temperatures, the cremaster muscle contracts and pulls the scrotum closer to the body, while the dartos fascia gives it a wrinkled appearance; when the temperature increases, the cremaster and dartos fascia relax to bring down the scrotum away from the body and remove the wrinkles respectively.

The scrotum remains connected with the abdomen or pelvic cavity through the inguinal canal. (The spermatic cord, formed from spermatic artery, vein and nerve bound together with connective tissue passes into the testis through inguinal canal.)

== Internal genitalia ==
Labelled illustration of human internal male genitalia

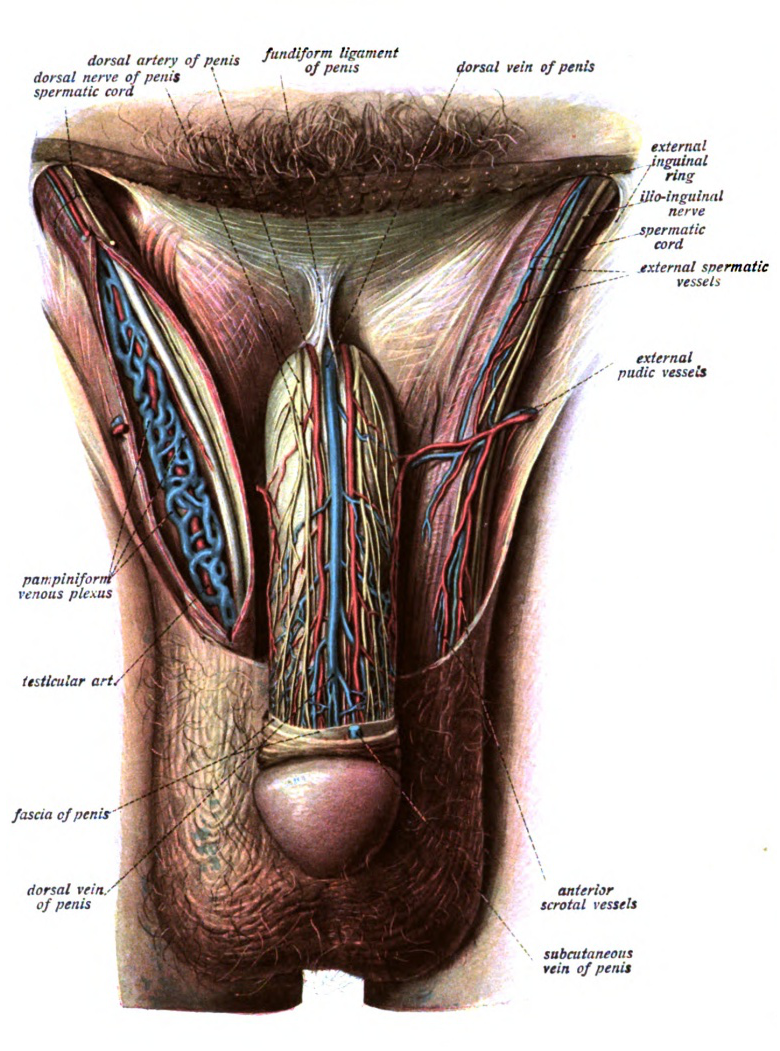
Image showing innervation and blood supply of the human external male genitalia

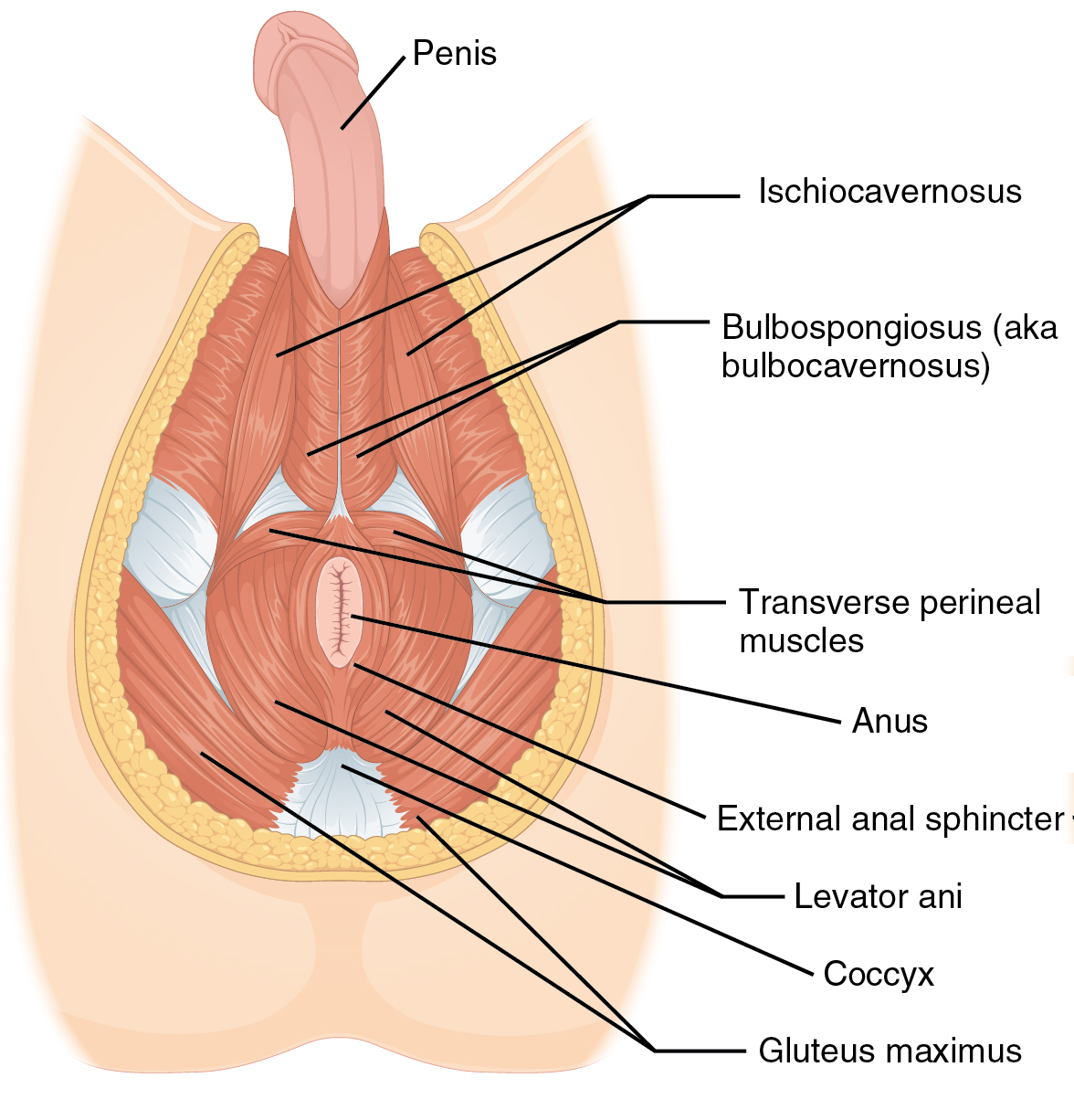
Muscles of the external male genitalia and perineum

=== Testicles ===
The testicles are two gonads that produce sperm by meiotic division of germ cells within the seminiferous tubules, and synthesize and secrete androgens that regulate the male reproductive functions. The site of production of androgens is the Leydig cells that are located in the interstitium between seminiferous tubules.

=== Epididymides ===
The epididymis is a long whitish mass of tightly coiled tube. The sperm that are produced in the seminiferous tubules flow into the epididymis. During passage via the epididymis, the sperm undergo maturation and are concentrated by the action of ion channels located on the apical membrane of the epididymis.

=== Vasa deferentia ===
The vas deferens, which is also known as the sperm duct, is a thin tube approximately 30 centimetres (0.98 ft) long that starts from the epididymis to the pelvic cavity. It carries the sperm (formally known as spermatozoa) from the epididymis to the ejaculatory duct.

=== Accessory glands ===
Three accessory glands provide fluids that lubricate the duct system and nourish the sperm cells.

- Seminal vesicles: two glands behind the bladder that secrete many of the semen's components.
- Prostate gland: a gland located below the bladder that produces seminal fluid and helps regulate urine flow.
- Bulbourethral glands: add fluid to semen during ejaculation (pre-ejaculate)

== Development ==
The embryonic and prenatal development of the male reproductive system is the process whereby the reproductive organs grow, mature and are established. It begins with a single fertilized egg and culminates 38 weeks later with the birth of a male child. It is a part of the stages of sexual differentiation. The development of the male reproductive system coincides with the urinary system. Their development can also be described together as the development of the urinary and reproductive organs.

=== Sexual determination ===
Human karyotype, showing 22 homologous autosomal chromosome pairs, both the female (XX) and male (XY) versions of the two sex chromosomes, as well as the mitochondrial genome (at bottom left).

Sexual identity is determined at fertilization when the genetic sex of the zygote has been initialized by a sperm cell containing either an X or Y chromosome. If this sperm cell contains an X chromosome it will coincide with the X chromosome of the ovum and a female child will develop. A sperm cell carrying a Y chromosome results in an XY combination, and a male child will develop.

Genetic sex determines whether the gonads will be testes or ovaries. In the developing embryo if the testes are developed, it will produce and secrete male sex hormones during late embryonic development and cause the secondary sex organs of the male to develop.

=== Other embryonic reproductive structures ===
The structures are masculinized by secretions of the testes:

- urogenital sinus
- genital tubercle
- urogenital folds
- cloacal membrane
- labioscrotal folds

The prostate gland derives from the urogenital sinus, and the other embryonic structures differentiate into the external genitalia. In the absence of testicular secretions, the female genitalia are formed.

=== External structures ===
At six weeks post-conception, the differentiation of the external genitalia in the male and female has not taken place. At eight weeks, a distinct phallus is present during the indifferent stage. By the 10th-12th week, the genitalia are distinctly male or female being and derived from their homologous structures. At 16 weeks post-conception, the genitalia are formed and distinct.

The masculinization of the embryonic reproductive structures occurs as a result of testosterone secreted by the embryonic testes. Testosterone, however, is not the active agent within these organs. Once inside the target cells, testosterone is converted by means of an enzyme called 5α-reductase into the dihydrotestosterone (DHT). DHT mediates the androgen effect in these organs.

=== Testes ===
At nine weeks, male differentiation of the gonads and the testes is well underway. Internal changes include the formation of the tubular seminar Chris tubules in the rete testis from the primary sex cord. Developing on the outside surface of each testis is a Phibro muscular cord called the gubernaculum. This structure attaches to the inferior portion of the testis and extends to the labial sacral fold of the same side at the same time, a portion of the embryonic mesonephric duct adjacent to the testis becomes attached and convoluted informs the epididymis. Another portion of the mesonephric duct becomes the ductus deferens.

The seminal vesicles form from lateral outgrowths of the caudal and of each mesonephric duct the prostate gland arises from an Indo dermal outgrowth of the urogenital sinus the bulbourethral glands develop from outgrowths in the membrane-like portion of the urethra.

The descent of the testes to its final location at the anterior abdominal wall, followed by the development of the gubernaculum, which subsequently pulls and translocates the testis down into the developing scrotum. Ultimately, the passageway closes behind the testis. A failure in this process can cause indirect inguinal hernia or an infantile hydrocoele. The testes descend into the scrotal sac between the sixth and 10th week. Descent does not occur until about the 28th week when compared to when canals form and the abdominal wall provides openings from the pelvic cavity to the scrotal sac. The process by which a testis descends is not well understood but it seems to be associated with the shortening of the gubernaculum. This is attached to the testis and extends through the inguinal canal to the wall of the scrotum as a testis. It carries with it the ductus deference, which are testicular vessels and nerves, a portion of the abdominal muscle, and lymph vessels. All of the structures remain attached to the testis and form what is known as the spermatic cord. By the time the testis is in the scrotal sac, the gubernaculum is no more than a remnant of scar like tissue.

Male germ cells formed in the testes are capable of special DNA repair processes that function during meiosis to repair DNA damages and to maintain the integrity of the genomes that are to be passed on to progeny. These DNA repair processes include homologous recombinational repair and non-homologous end joining.

=== External genitalia ===
The external genitalia of the male is distinct from those of the female by the end of the ninth week. Prior to that, the genital tubercle in both sexes is a phallus. The urethral groove forms on the ventral surface of the phallus early in development during the differentiation of the external genitalia. This is caused by the androgens produced and secreted by the testes. Androgen induced development causes the elongation and differentiation of the phallus into a penis, a fusion of the urogenital folds surrounding the urethral groove along the ventral surface of the penis, and a midline closure of the labioscrotal folds. This closure forms the wall of the scrotum the external genitalia. The external genitalia are completely formed by the end of the 12th week.

At birth, the development of the prepubertal male reproductive system is completed. During the second trimester of pregnancy, testosterone secretion in the male declines so that at birth the testes are inactive. Gonadotropin secretion is low until the beginning of puberty.

=== Summary ===
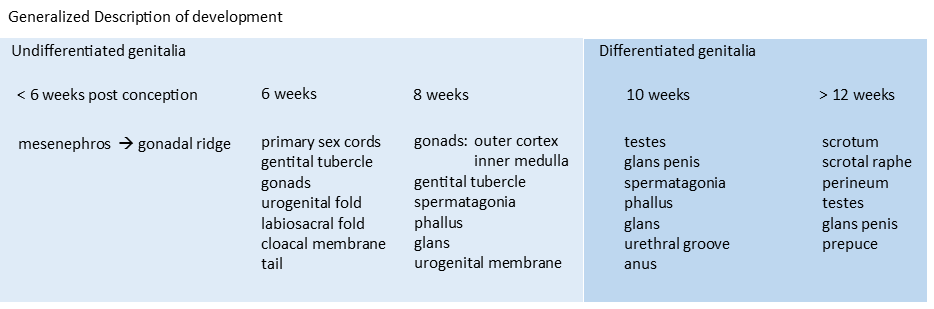
Chart of the generalized male reproductive system embryionic

The genetic sex is determined by whether a Y bearing or X bearing sperm fertilizes the ovum; the presence or absence of a Y chromosome in turn determines whether the gonads of the embryo will be testes or ovaries; and the presence or absence of testes, finally, determines whether the sex accessory organs and external genitalia will be male or female. This sequence is understandable in light of the fact that both male and female embryos develop within the maternal environment - high in estrogen secreted by the mother's ovaries and the placenta. If estrogen determined the sex, all embryos would become feminized.

=== Puberty ===
During puberty, increased gonadotropin secretion stimulates a rise in sex steroids creation from the testes. The increased secretion of testosterone from the testes during puberty causes the male secondary sexual characteristics to be manifested.

Male secondary sex characteristics include:

- Growth of body hair, including underarm, abdominal, chest hair and pubic hair.
- Growth of facial hair.
- Enlargement of larynx (Adam's apple) and deepening of voice.
- Increased stature; adult males are taller than adult females, on average.
- Heavier skull and bone structure.
- Increased muscle mass and strength.
- Broadening of shoulders and chest; shoulders wider than hips.
- Increased secretions of oil and sweat glands.

Secondary development includes the increased activity of the eccrine sweat glands and sebaceous glands along with the darkening of the skin in the scrotal region.

== Clinical significance ==
=== Chromosomal abnormalities ===
Sex chromosomes in XO sex determination

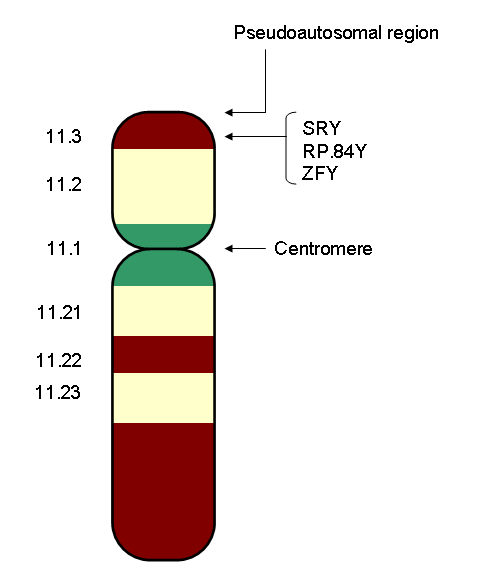
YChromShowingSRY2

Chromosomal abnormalities can occur during fertilization impacting the development of the male reproductive system. The genotype of the male consists of a Y chromosome paired with an X chromosome. Female sex is determined by the absence of a Y chromosome. Some individuals are male who have the XX male syndrome and androgen insensitivity syndrome. This occurs when one X chromosome contains a segment of the Y chromosome, which was inserted into the X chromosome of the father's sperm. Rarely females are born with the XY genotype. They are found to be missing the same portion of the Y chromosome as was inserted into the chromosome of XX males. The gene for sexual differentiation in humans, called the testis determining factor (TDF), is located on the short arm of the Y chromosome. The presence or absence of the Y chromosome determines whether the embryo will have testes or ovaries. An abnormal number of sex chromosomes (aneuploidy) can occur. This includes Turner's syndrome - a single X chromosome is present, Klinefelter's syndrome - two X chromosomes and a Y chromosome are present, XYY syndrome and XXYY syndrome. Other less common chromosomal arrangements include: triple X syndrome, 48, XXXX, and 49, XXXXX.

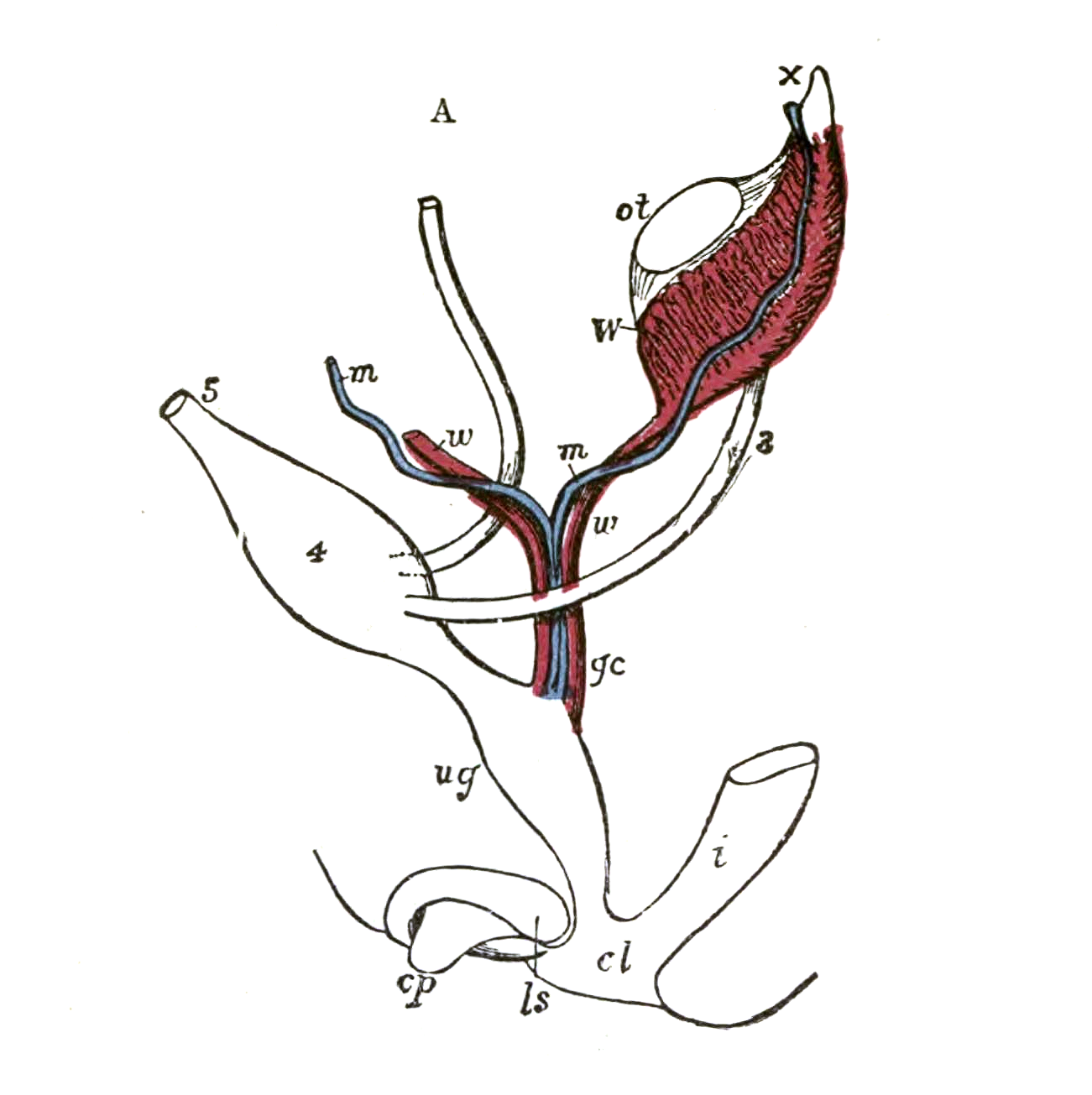
A.—Diagram of the primitive urogenital organs, from 'Diagrams to show the development of male and female generative organs from a common type' * w, w. Right and left Wolffian ducts.

The observable, visual differences become apparent between male or the female reproductive organs are not seen initially. Maturation continues as the medial aspect of each mesonephros grows to form the genital ridge. The genital ridge continues to grow behind the developing peritoneal membrane. By week six, string-like cell congregations called primitive sex cords form within the enlarging genital ridge. Externally, a swelling called the genital tubercle appears above the cloacal membrane.

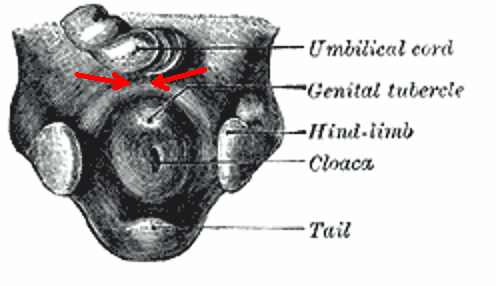
The mesoderm extends to the midventral line.

External distinctions are not observed even by the eighth week of pre-embryonic development. This is the indifferent stage during which the gonads are relatively large and have an outer cortex of primitive sex cords and an inner medulla.

Specialized primordial germ cells are forming and migrating from the yolk sac to the embryonic gonads during week eight and nine. These are the spermatogonia in the developing male. Before seven weeks after fertilization, the gonads have the potential to become either testes or ovaries. Reproductive sex organs for both male and female are derived from the same embryonic tissues and are considered homologous tissues or organs.

Testosterone

After the testes have differentiated, male sex hormones, called androgens, are secreted from interstitial cells (cells of Leydig). The major androgens secreted by these cells is testosterone and secretion begins 8 to 10 weeks after conception. Testosterone secretion reaches a peak at 12 to 14 weeks, and declines to very low levels by the end of the second trimester (about 21 weeks). Levels are the barely detectable 4–6 months of age postnatal. High levels of testosterone will not appear again until the time of puberty.

Internal accessory sex organs to develop and most of these are derived from two systems of embryonic ducts. Male accessory organs are derived from mesonephric (Wolffian) ducts. The developing tubules within the testes secretes a polypeptide Müllerian inhibition factor (MIF). MIF causes the regression of the paramesonephritic ducts 60 days after fertilization. Testosterone secretion by the interstitial cells of the testes then causes the growth and development of the mesonephric ducts into male secondary sex organs. The Müllerian ducts atrophy, but traces of their anterior ends are represented by the appendices testis (hydatids of Morgagni of the male), while their terminal fused portions form the utriculus on the floor of the prostatic urethra. This is due to the production of anti-Müllerian hormone by the Sertoli cells of the testes.

== Gallery ==
Perspective view

Sagittal view

Front view

== See also ==
- Evolution of sexual reproduction
- Male infertility
- Oncofertility
- Reproductive system
- Spermatogenesis

== Bibliography ==
- Van de Graaff, Kent M.; Fox, Stuart Ira (1989). Concepts of Human Anatomy and Physiology. Dubuque, Iowa: William C. Brown Publishers. ISBN 0697056759.
- Elson, Lawrence; Kapit, Wynn (1977). The Anatomy Coloring. New York, New York: Harper & Row. ISBN 0064539148.
- "Gross Anatomy Image". Medical Gross Anatomy Atlas Images. University of Michigan Medical School. 1997.
- Berkow, Robert, ed. (1977). The Merck Manual of Medical Information; Home Edition. Whitehouse Station, New Jersey: Merck Research Laboratories. ISBN 0911910875.
- Fauci, Anthony S.; Braunwald, Eugene; Kasper, Dennis L.; Hauser, Stephen L.; Longo, Dan L.; Jameson, J. Larry; Loscalzo, Joseph (2008). Harrison's Principles of Internal Medicine (17th ed.). McGraw-Hill Medical. pp. 2339–2346. ISBN 9780071466332.
