= HGSC =

HGSC may refer to:

- Harvard Gender and Sexuality Caucus (formerly Harvard Gay and Lesbian Caucus), American non-profit organization of LGBT alumni/ae, faculty, staff and students
- Human Genome Sequencing Center, human genetics center at Baylor College of Medicine in Houston, Texas
- High-grade serous carcinoma, a type of epithelial tumour that makes up the majority of ovarian cancer cases
