= Hydatid =

Hydatid may refer to:

- Echinococcosis
- Echinococcus granulosus, known as the hydatid tapeworm
- Hydatid of Morgagni
- Hydatidiform mole or hydatid mole
