= Coelomic epithelium =

Coelomic epithelium refers to the epithelium that lines the surface of the body wall and abdominal organs. It constitutes the outermost layer of the male and female gonads, thus forming the germinal epithelium of the female or of the male. It is also called the germinal epithelium of Waldeyer or sometimes the superficial epithelial cells in embryology. It is often encountered in the medical setting as an important source of various types of ovarian cancer, primary peritoneal serous cancer and endometriosis (coelomic metaplasia).

During gonadal sex development, the coelomic epithelium, additionally with germ cells and mesenchymal cells make the indifferent gonad. As the coelomic epithelium is confronted with XY chromosomes, they will differentiate into sertoli cells, which subsequently produce anti-Müllerian hormone, leading to the regression of the Müllerian duct. As the coelomic epithelium is confronted with XX chromosomes, the cells will differentiate into granulosa cells, which will not produce anti-Müllerian hormone and thus allow the development of the Müllerian duct.

The coelomic metaplasia theory provides a theory for the pathology of endometriosis (a condition where endometrial tissue grows outside the uterus). The coelomic epithelium develops into: peritoneum, pleura and the surface of the ovary. This combines retrograde and metaplasia and may explain the distant sites of endometriosis.
