= Appendix of testis =

Part of the testis

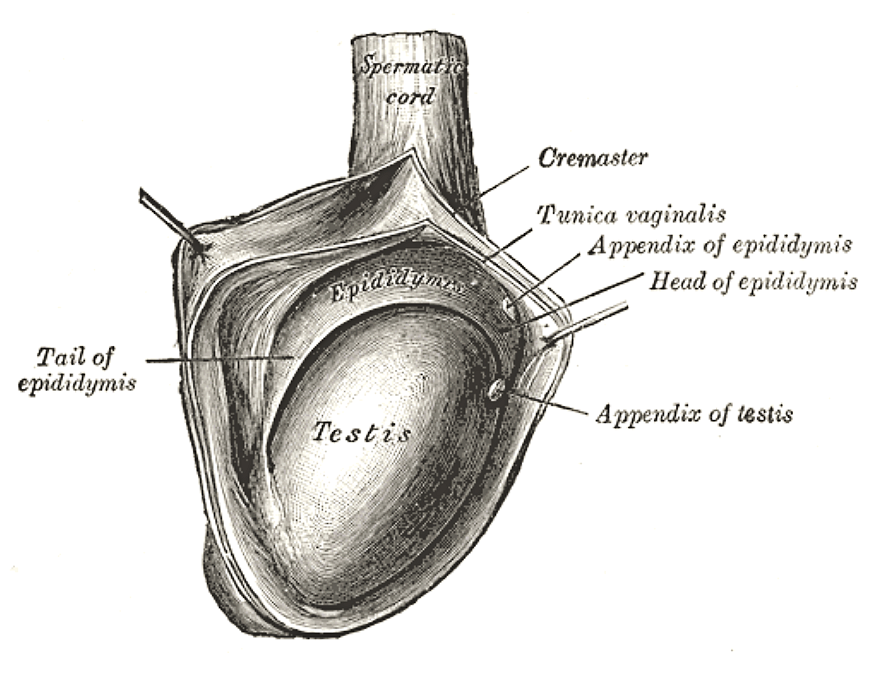
- The right testis, exposed by laying open the tunica vaginalis (appendix of testis is labeled at right)

Details
- Precursor: Paramesonephric duct
- Artery: Testicular artery
- Vein: Testicular vein, pampiniform plexus

Identifiers
- Latin: appendix testis
- TA98: A09.3.02.010
- TA2: 3612
- FMA: 19846 19846, 19846

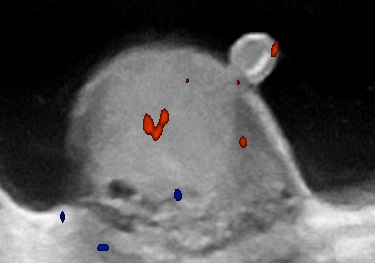
Scrotal ultrasonography of an 85-year-old man with hydrocele, making the appendix of the testicle clearly distinctive as a 4 mm outpouching at upper right in image. Doppler shows some blood flow.

The appendix testis (or hydatid of Morgagni) is a vestigial remnant of the Müllerian duct, present on the upper pole of the testis and attached to the tunica vaginalis. It is present about 90% of the time.

== Clinical significance ==
=== Torsion ===
The appendix of testis can occasionally become twisted, causing acute one-sided testicular pain and may require surgical excision to achieve relief. One third of patients present with a palpable "blue dot" discoloration on the scrotum. This is nearly diagnostic of this condition. If clinical suspicion is high for the serious differential diagnosis of testicular torsion, a surgical exploration of the scrotum is warranted. Torsion of the appendix of testis occurs at ages 0–15 years, with a mean at 10 years, which is similar to that of testicular torsion.

== See also ==
- Paraovarian cyst
