= Papillary serous cystadenocarcinoma =

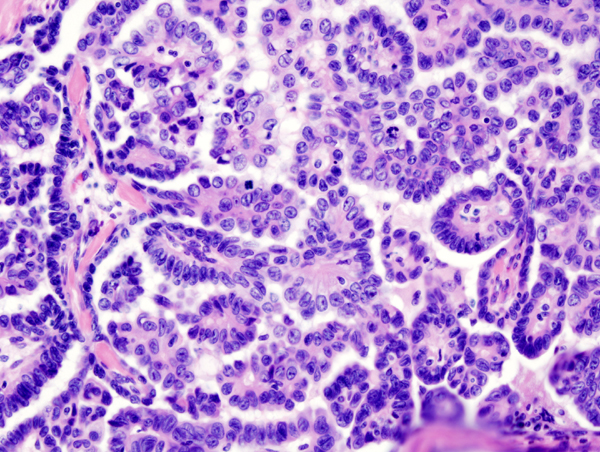
- Medium power slide of ovarian serous adenocarcinoma stained using haematoxylin and eosin
- Specialty: Oncology

Papillary serous cystadenocarcinomas are the most common form of malignant ovarian cancer making up 26 percent of ovarian tumours in women aged over 20 in the United States.

As with most ovarian tumours, due to the lack of early signs of disease these tumours can be large when discovered and have often metastasized, often by spreading along the peritoneum.

== Histopathology ==
Papillary serous cystadenocarcinomas may exhibit psammoma bodies upon histopathology.

== Epidemiology ==
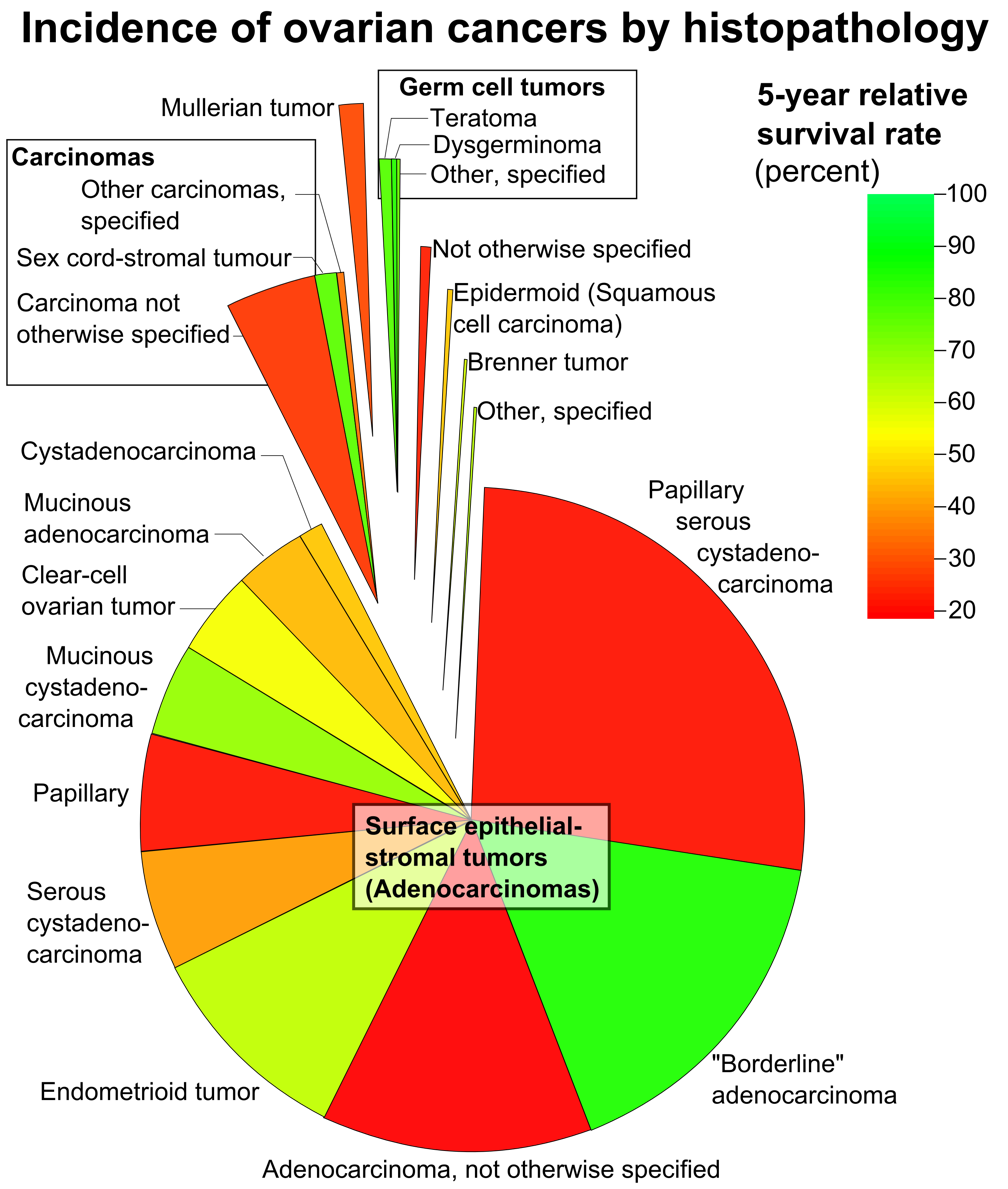
Ovarian cancers in women aged 20+, with area representing relative incidence and color representing 5-year relative survival rate. Papillary serous cystadenocarcinoma is labeled at center right.

== Gallery ==
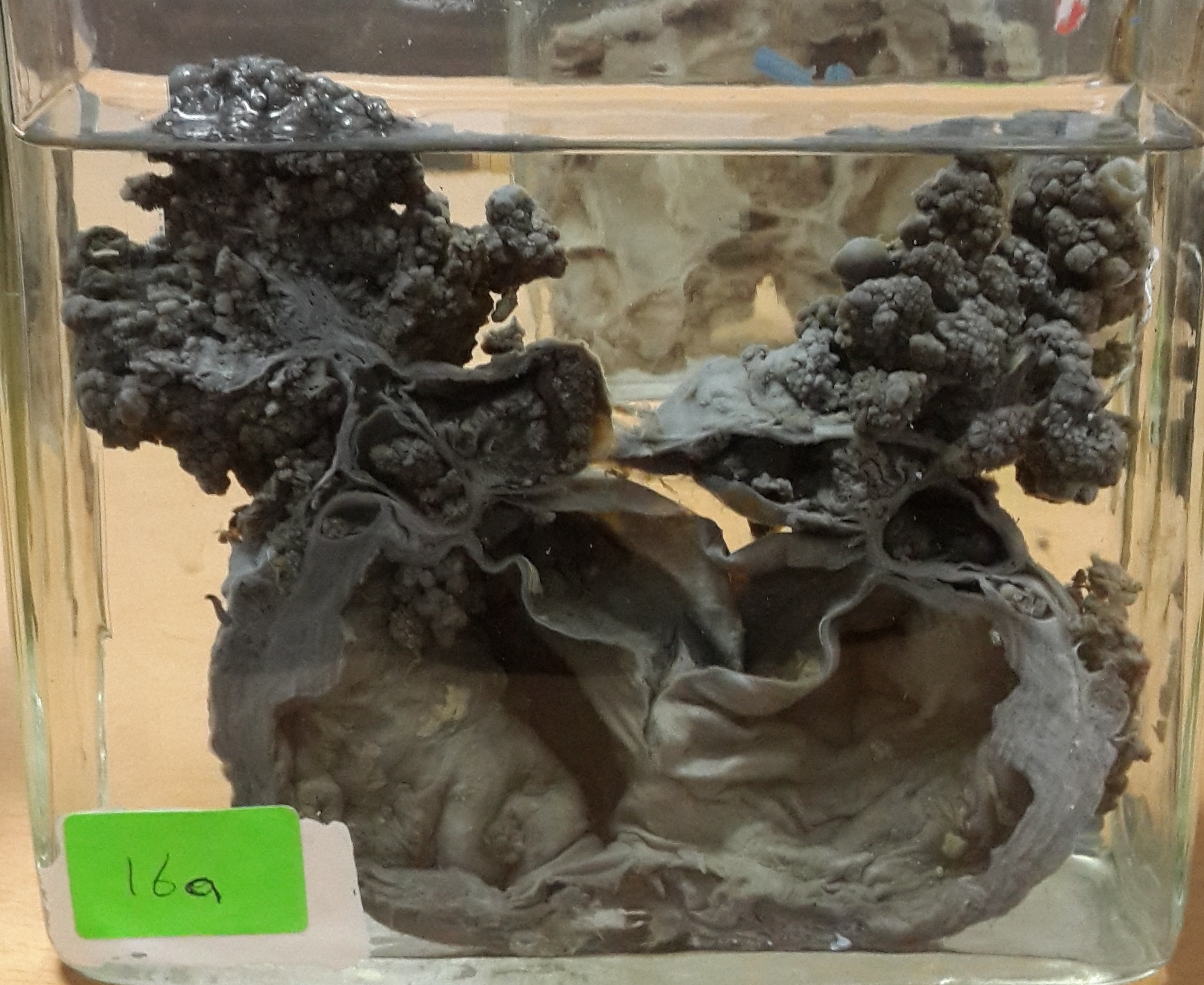
Papillary serous cystadenoma
