= Psammoma body =

Microscopic nodule of calcium in the body

Micrograph of psammoma body in the centre of the field in a meningioma of brain. H&E stain.

A psammoma body is a round collection of calcium, seen microscopically. The term is derived from Greek άμμος (ámmos) 'sand'.

== Cause ==
Psammoma bodies are associated with the papillary (nipple-like) histomorphology and are thought to arise from,

1. Infarction and calcification of papillae tips.
2. Calcification of intralymphatic tumor thrombi.

== Association with lesions ==
Psammoma bodies are commonly seen in certain tumors such as:

- Papillary thyroid carcinoma
- Papillary renal cell carcinoma
- Ovarian papillary serous cystadenoma and cystadenocarcinoma
- Endometrial adenocarcinomas (papillary serous carcinoma ~3%-4%)
- Meningiomas, in the central nervous system
- Peritoneal and pleural mesothelioma
- Somatostatinoma (pancreas)
- Prolactinoma of the pituitary
- Glucagonoma
- Micropapillary subtype of lung adenocarcinoma

== Benign lesions ==
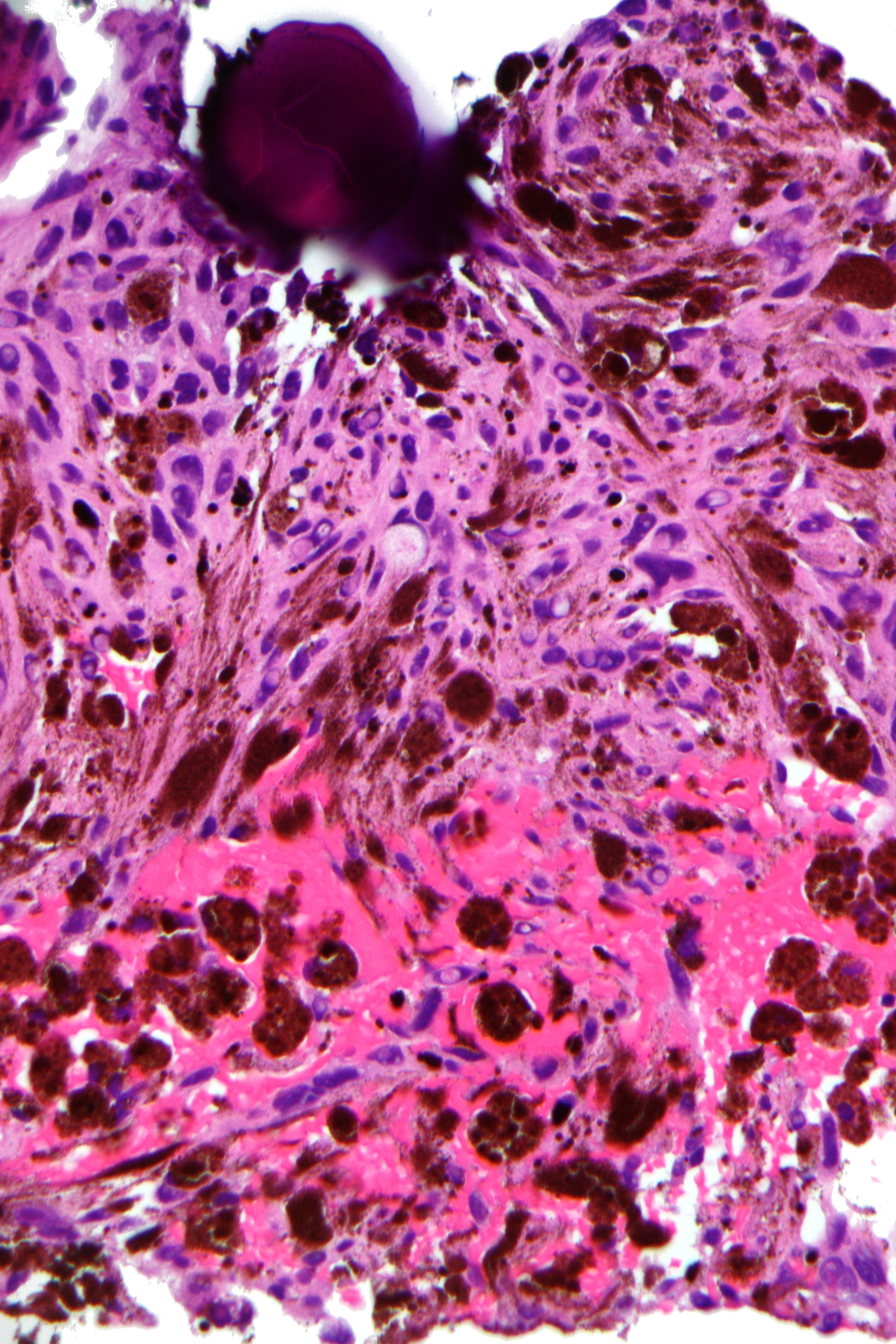
Micrograph of a psammomatous melanotic schwannoma with a psammoma body, as may be seen in Carney complex. H&E stain.

Psammoma bodies may be seen in:

- Endosalpingiosis
- Psammomatous melanotic schwannoma
- Melanocytic nevus

== Appearance ==
Psammoma bodies usually have a laminar appearance, are circular, acellular and basophilic.
