= Hydatid of Morgagni =

The hydatid of Morgagni can refer to one of two closely related bodily structures:

- Appendix of testis (in the male)
- Paraovarian cyst (in the female)
