= Ovarian surface epithelium =

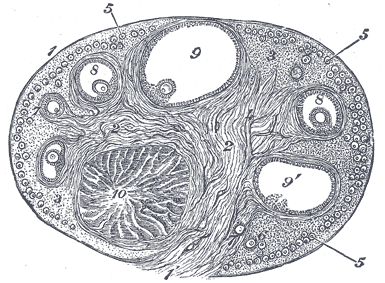
- Section of the ovary. 1. Ovarian surface epithelium. 2. Central stroma. 3. Peripheral stroma. 4. Bloodvessels. 5. Vesicular follicles in their earliest stage. 6, 7, 8. More advanced follicles. 9. An almost mature follicle. 9'. Follicle from which the ovum has escaped. 10. Corpus luteum.

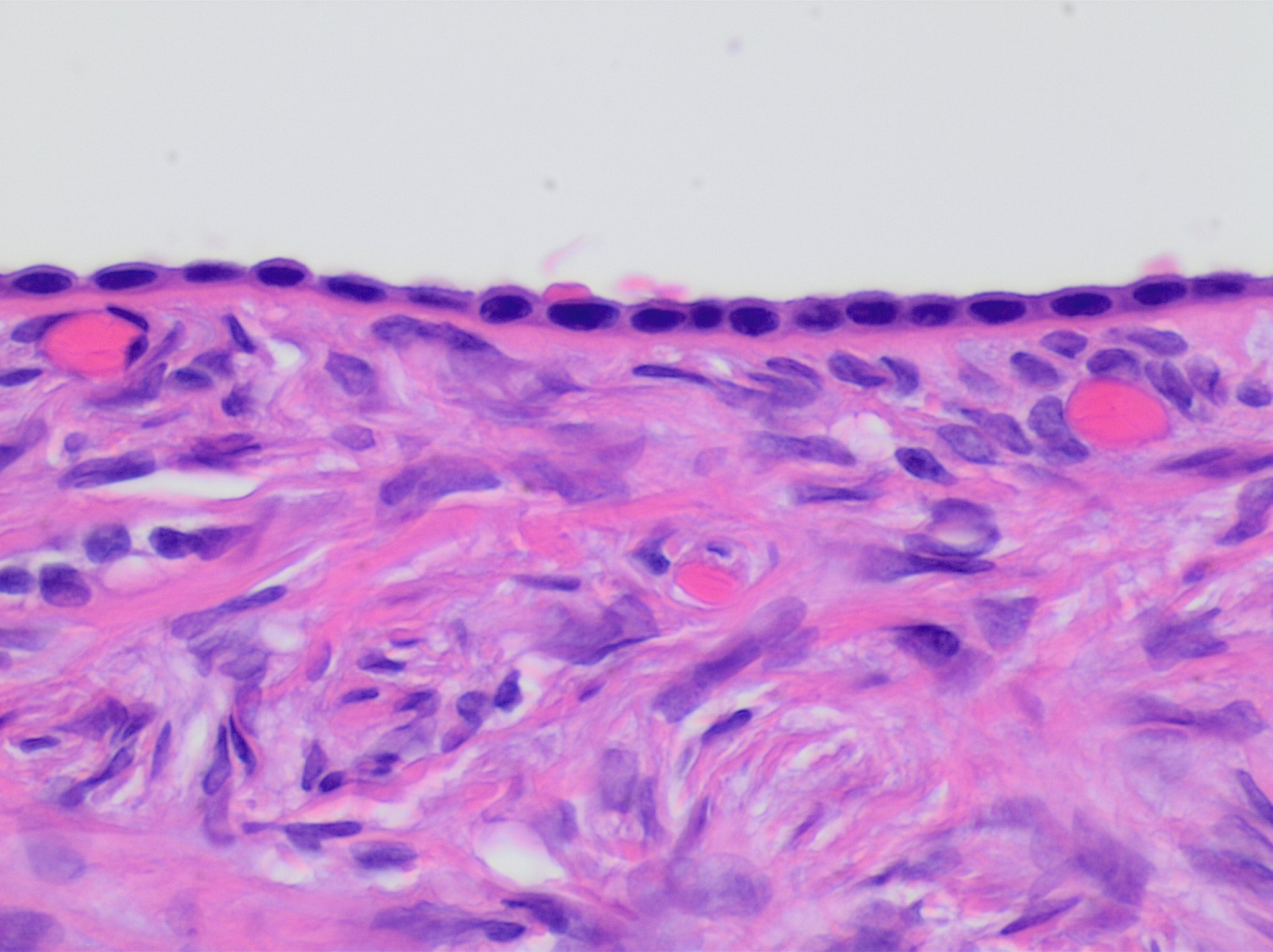
- Micrograph of ovarian surface epithelium. H&E stain. The epithelium is the chain-like covering with round dark blue nuclei at top.

Identifiers
- FMA: 18629

The ovarian surface epithelium, also called the germinal epithelium (of Waldeyer) or coelomic epithelium, is a single layer of simple squamous-to-cuboidal epithelial cells covering the ovary. It is subject to cyclic rupturing during ovulation, and responsible for its consequent repair.

The term germinal epithelium is a misnomer as it does not give rise to primary follicles.

== Composition ==
These epithelial cells are derived from the mesoderm during embryonic development and are closely related to the mesothelium of the peritoneum. The germinal epithelium gives the ovary a dull gray color as compared with the shining smoothness of the peritoneum; and the transition between the mesothelium of the peritoneum and the cuboidal cells which cover the ovary is usually marked by a line around the anterior border of the ovary.

== Clinical significance ==
Ovarian surface epithelium can give rise to surface epithelial-stromal tumor.
