= Endosalpingiosis =

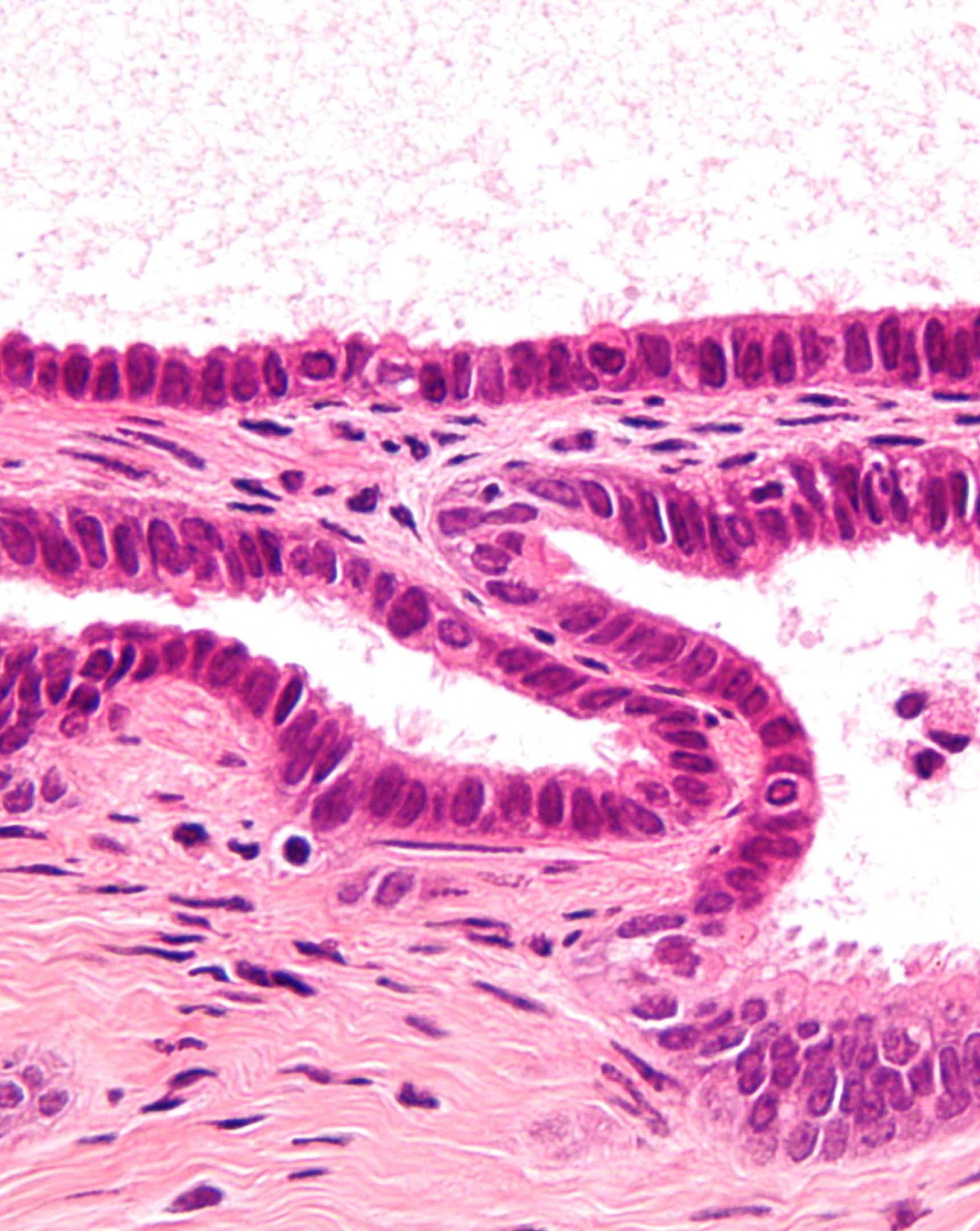
- High magnification micrograph of endosalpingiosis, showing the characteristic cystic spaces lined by a simple epithelium with cilia. H&E stain.
- Specialty: Gynecology
- Differential diagnosis: Uterine prolapse

Endosalpingiosis is a condition in which fallopian tube-like epithelium is found outside the fallopian tube. It is unknown what causes this condition. It is generally accepted that the condition develops from transformation of coelomic tissue. It is often an incidental finding and is not usually associated with any pathology.

== Signs and symptoms ==
The significance of endosalpingiosis is not settled; medical experts differ on whether the condition itself causes issues or whether it is an asymptomatic finding. Common symptoms include, pelvic pain, infertility, menstrual irregularities and dyspareunia. Further reports suggest chronic back pain as a common issue reported years before diagnosis. Experts are unclear as the condition itself is a rare finding and lack of knowledge presents itself as a challenge.

Like the uterine endometrium of endometriosis, estrogen can cause salpingoitic tissues outside of the fallopian tubes to grow and potentially aggravate the surrounding areas. High levels cause the glandular tissues to proliferate and, especially important, they cause the number of and activity of ciliated epithelial cells (that would normally line the fallopian tubes) to increase.

== Diagnosis ==
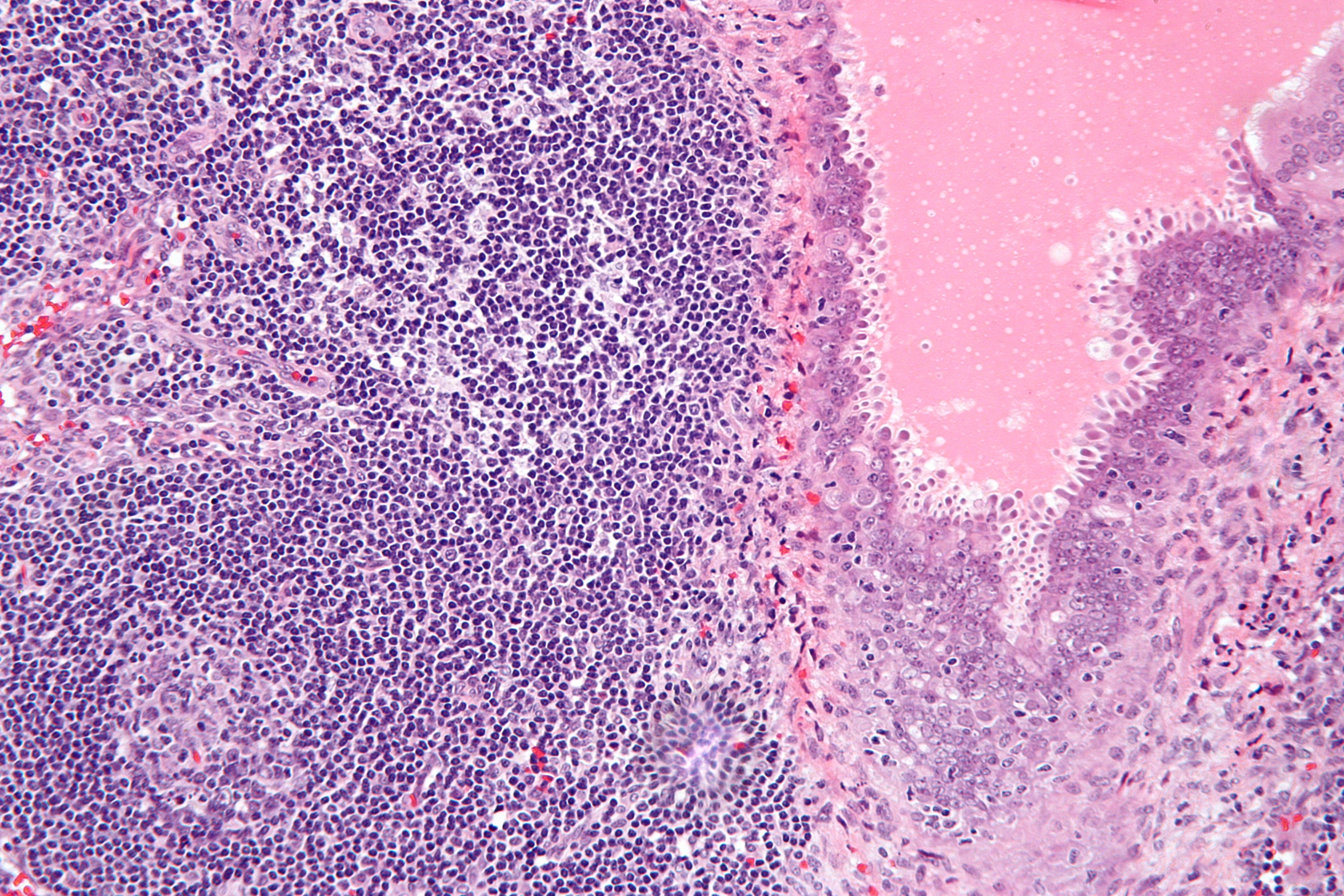
Micrograph showing endosalpingiosis in a lymph node. H&E stain.

Endosalpingiosis is diagnosed by a pathologist on excision (e.g. biopsy).

It is characterized by cysts with tubal-type epithelium (e.g. ciliated epithelium) surrounded by a fibrous stroma. It is not often associated with hemorrhage.

A tubal-type epithelium surrounded by endometrial-type stroma is a variant of endometriosis, not endosalpingiosis.

Endosalpingiosis is occasionally found in lymph nodes, and may be misinterpreted as an adenocarcinoma metastasis.

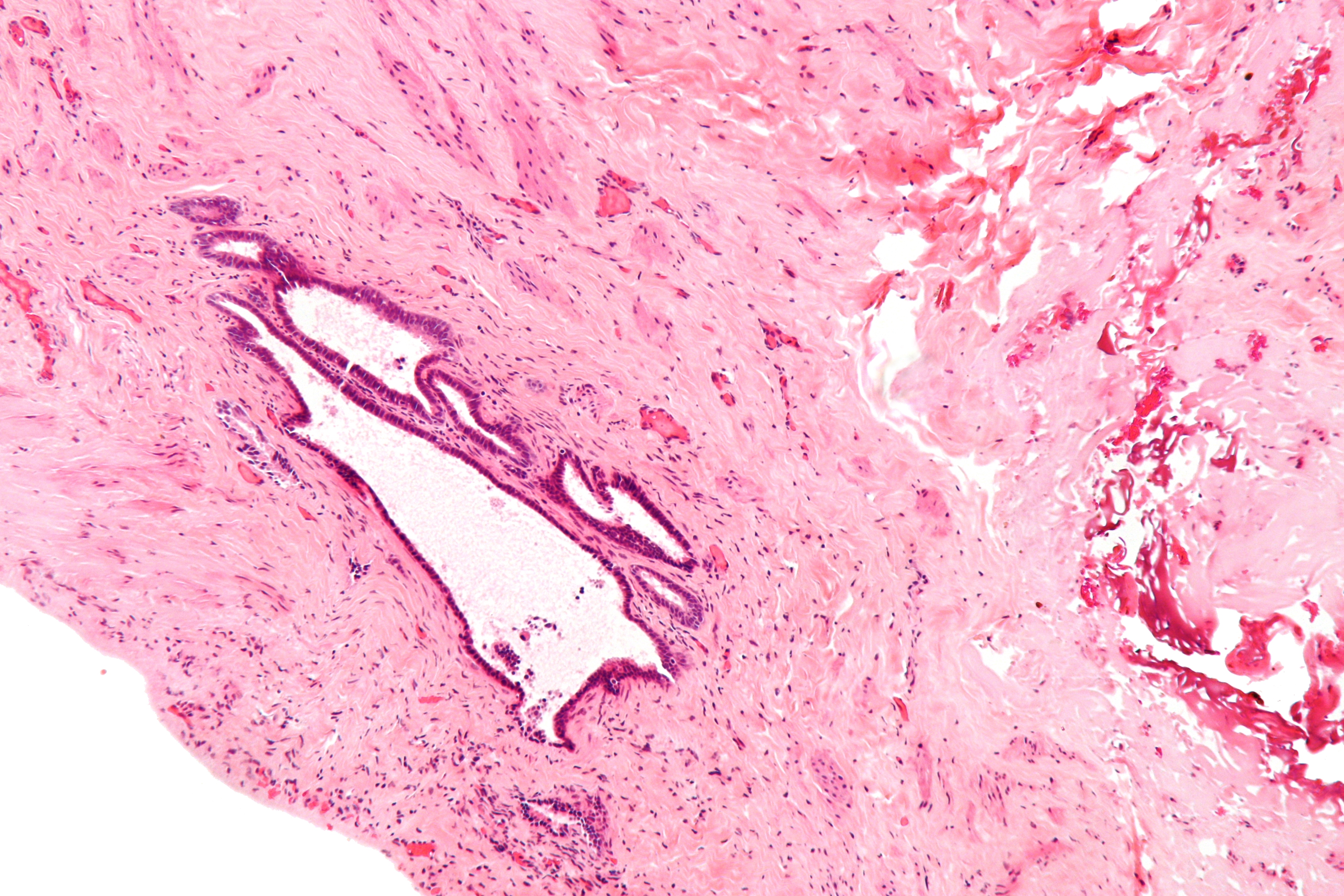
Intermed. mag.

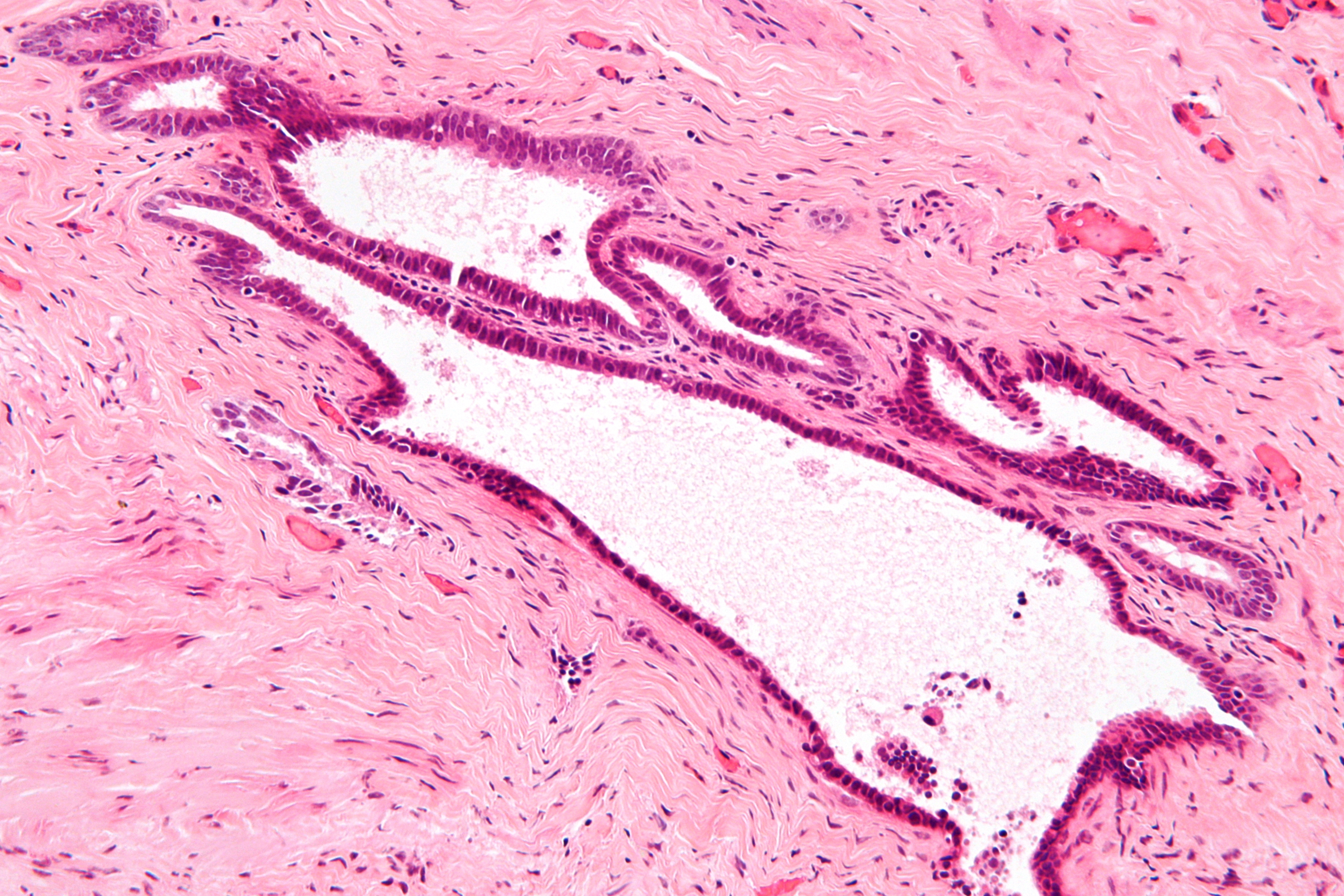
High mag.

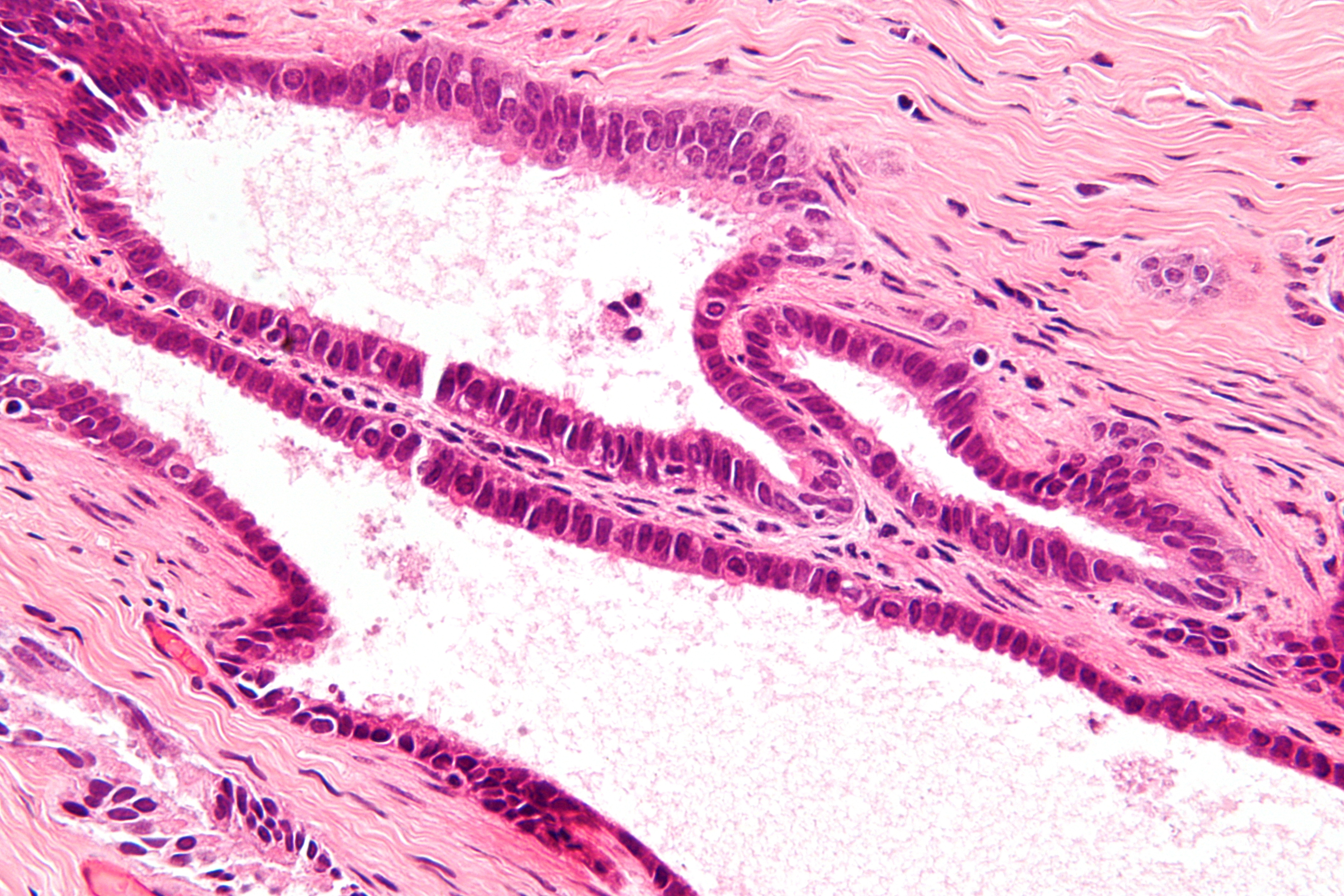
Very high mag.

== Treatment ==
As endosalpingiosis, generally, is not considered a pathology, treatment is not always necessary. However the treatment of other problems caused by this condition, such as ovarian cysts, chocolate cysts, fertility, pelvic pain, adhesions, dyspareunia may need to be addressed depending on the case.

Similar to endometriosis, cases of endosalpingiosis that cause significant amounts of pain can be treated with excision surgery by a specialist, though this is not a cure. Removal of the tissues, cysts, and adhesions can help to greatly reduce symptoms. Some surgeons believe add-back therapy with progesterone to also be helpful in reducing symptoms. Taking progesterone continuously keeps a woman at a specific time in her menstrual cycle. This prevents the body from reaching high levels of estrogen found in ovulation and further aggravating the condition. Dietary estrogen can wreak havoc in highly sensitive cases, and similar to endometriosis women are encouraged to eat diets low in estrogens. This means avoiding foods like soy, black liquorice, and tofu, to name a few.

== See also ==
- Endometriosis
- Metaplasia
