= Paraovarian cyst =

- Other names: Paratubal cyst, hydatid cyst of Morgagni
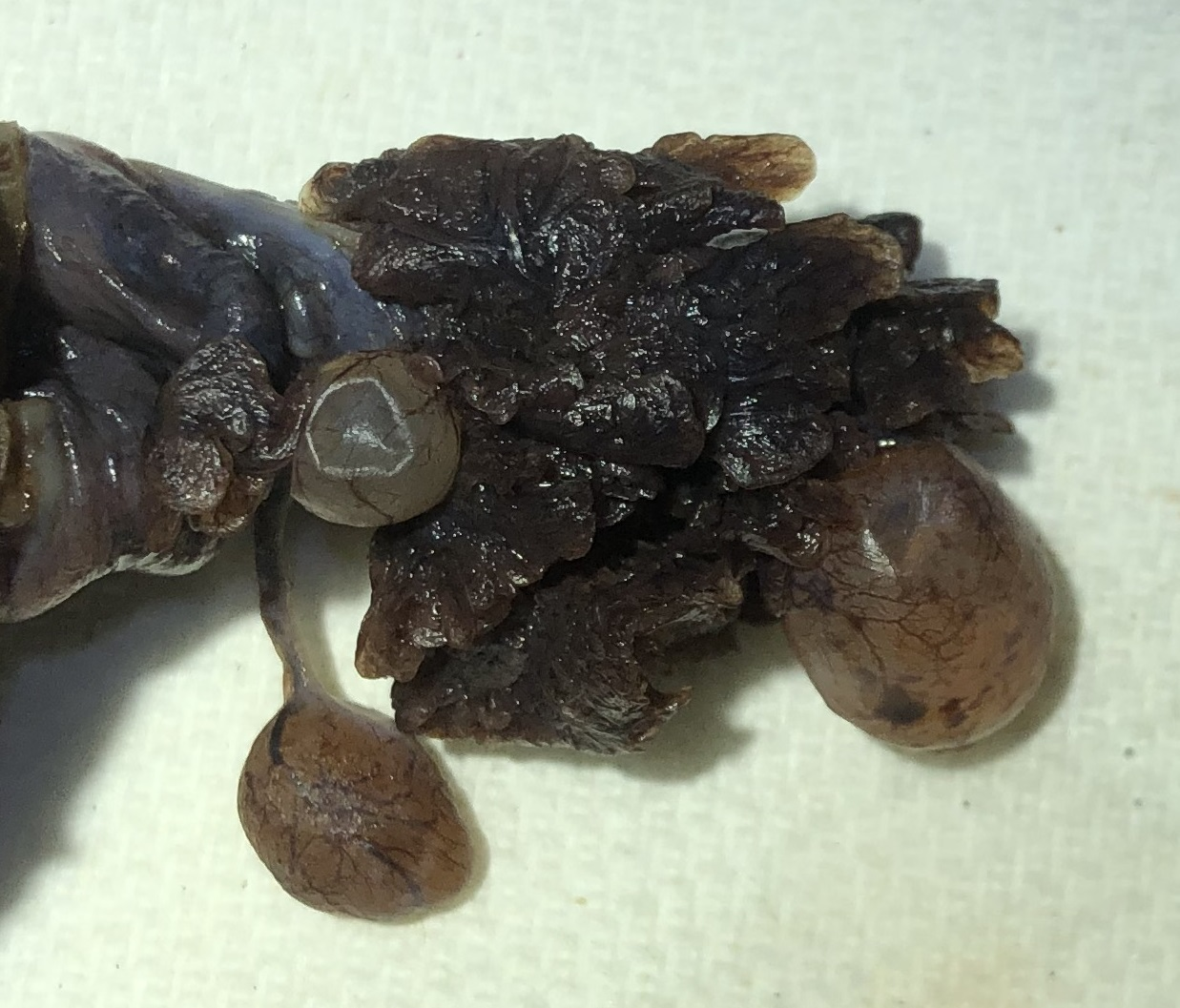
- Multiple paratubal cysts by a fallopian tube
- Specialty: Gynecology

Paraovarian cysts or paratubal cysts are epithelium-lined fluid-filled cysts in the adnexa adjacent to the fallopian tube and ovary. The terms are used interchangeably, and depend on the location of the cyst.

== Pathophysiology ==
PTCs originate from the mesothelium and are presumed to be remnants of the Müllerian duct and Wolffian duct.

== Diagnosis ==
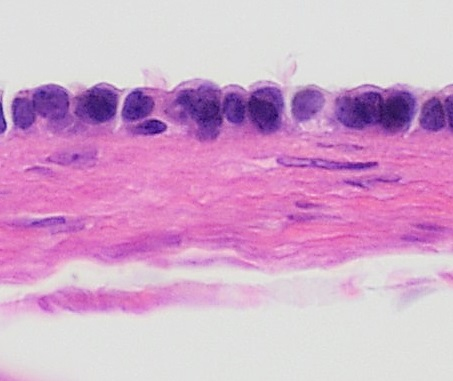
On histopathology, paraovarian cysts are generally lined by simple cuboidal epithelium as shown. However, they may have fallopian tubal epithelium or focal papillary projections.

Most cysts are small and asymptomatic. Typical sizes reported are 1 to 8 cm in diameter. PTCs may be found at surgery or during an imaging examination that is performed for another reason. Larger lesions may reach 20 or more cm in diameter and become symptomatic exerting pressure and pain symptoms in the lower abdomen. Large cysts can lead to torsion of the adnexa inflicting acute pain.

Prior to surgery, PTCs are usually seen on ultrasonography. However, because of the proximity of the ovary that may display follicle cysts, it may be a challenge to identify a cyst as paratubal or paraovarian.

== Malignancy ==
PTCs are generally benign, but may, on rare occasions, give rise to borderline tumors and malignancies.

== Management ==
Smaller lesions can be followed expectantly. Larger lesions, lesions that are growing or symptomatic, and lesions with sonographically suspicious findings (septation, papillations, fluid and solid components) are generally surgically explored and removed.

== Epidemiology ==
PTCs have been reported in all female age groups and seem to be most common in the third to fifth decades of life. A study in Italy estimated their incidence to be about 3%, while an autopsy study of postmenopausal women detected them in about 4% of cases. These cysts constitute about 10% of adnexal masses.

== Hydatid cysts of Morgagni ==
Hydatid cysts of Morgagni, also hydatids of Morgagni or Morgagni's cysts, are common and appear as pedunculated, often tiny, frequently multiple cysts connected to the fimbriae of the fallopian tubes. They thus appear to be a specific variant of paratubal cysts. They are named after Giovanni Battista Morgagni.

While usually asymptomatic, it has been noted that these cysts tend to be more common in women with unexplained infertility (52.1% versus 25.6% in controls, p<0.001) and suggested that they may play a role in infertility. It has been proposed that these cysts interfere with tubal pick-up and function.
