= List of related male and female reproductive organs =

Developmentally related sexual organs

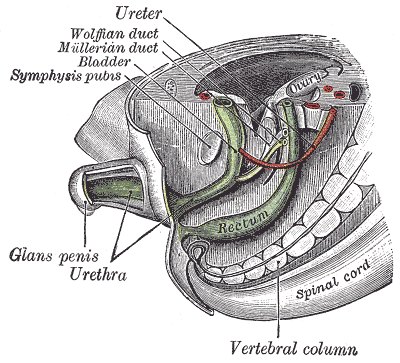
Tail end of human embryo, from eight and a half to nine weeks old.

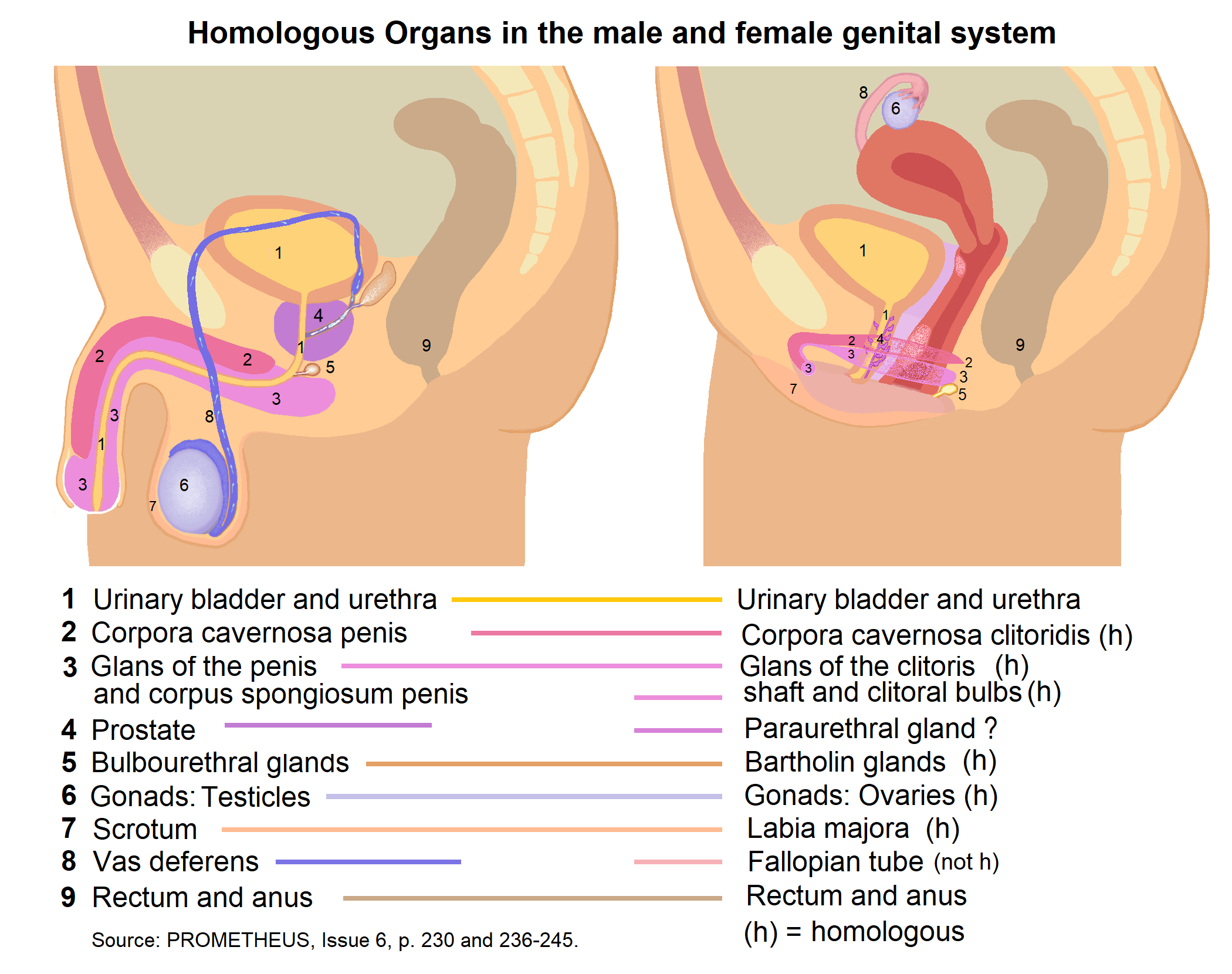
1 - 7: Homologous male and female pelvic organs.

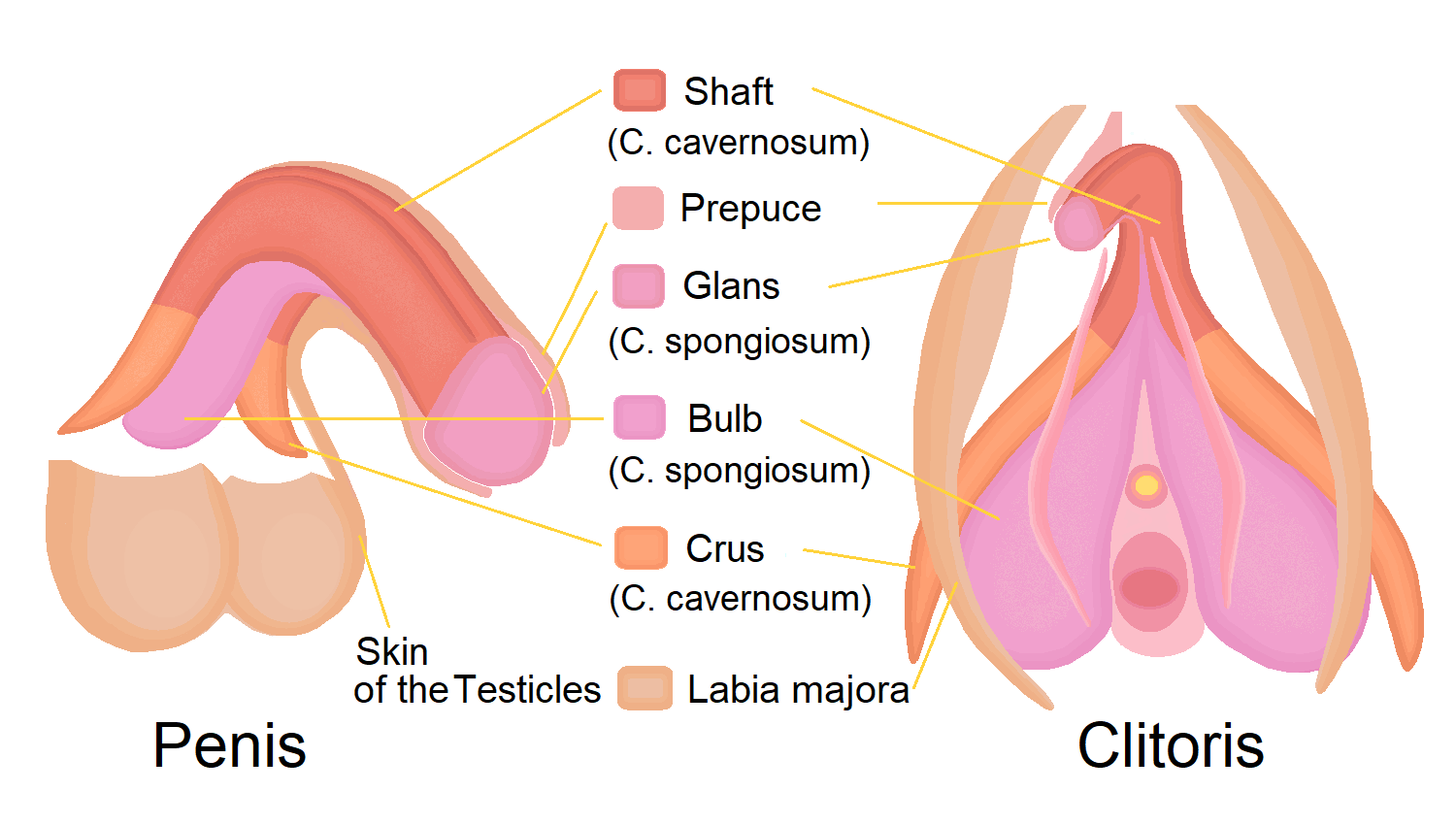
Homologous structures in the external genitalia

This list of related male and female reproductive organs shows how the male and female reproductive organs and the development of the reproductive system are related, sharing a common developmental path. This makes them biological homologues. These organs differentiate into the respective sex organs in males and females.

== List ==
| Embryological precursor | Female | Male |
|---|---|---|
| Gonad | Ovary | Testicle |
| | Rete ovarii | Rete testis |
| Paramesonephric ducts (Müllerian ducts) | Fallopian tube | |
| Paramesonephric ducts (Müllerian ducts) | | Appendix testis |
| Paramesonephric ducts (Müllerian ducts) | Uterus, cervix, vagina | Prostatic utricle |
| Mesonephric ducts (Wolffian ducts) | Epoophoron | Epididymis |
| Mesonephric ducts (Wolffian ducts) | Gartner's duct | |
| Mesonephric ducts (Wolffian ducts) | | Vas deferens |
| Mesonephric ducts (Wolffian ducts) | | Seminal vesicle |
| Mesonephric tubules | Paroophoron | Paradidymis |
| Urogenital sinus | Skene's glands | Prostate |
| Urogenital sinus | Bladder, urethra | Bladder, urethra |
| Urogenital sinus | Bartholin's gland | Bulbourethral gland |
| Labioscrotal folds | Labia majora | Scrotum |
| Urogenital folds | Labia minora | Ventral penile skin and penile raphe |
| Genital tubercle | Clitoris | Penis |
| Genital tubercle | Glans clitoridis | Glans penis |
| Genital tubercle | Corpus clitoridis | Corpus penis |
| Crus | Clitoral crura | Penile crura |
| Bulb | Clitoral bulbs | Penile bulb |
| Erectile tissue | Corpora cavernosa clitoridis | Corpora cavernosa penis |
| Prepuce | Clitoral hood | Foreskin |
| Frenulum | Clitoral frenulum | Penile frenulum |
| Peritoneum | Canal of Nuck | Processus vaginalis |
| Gubernaculum | Round ligament of uterus | Gubernaculum testis |

== Internal organs ==
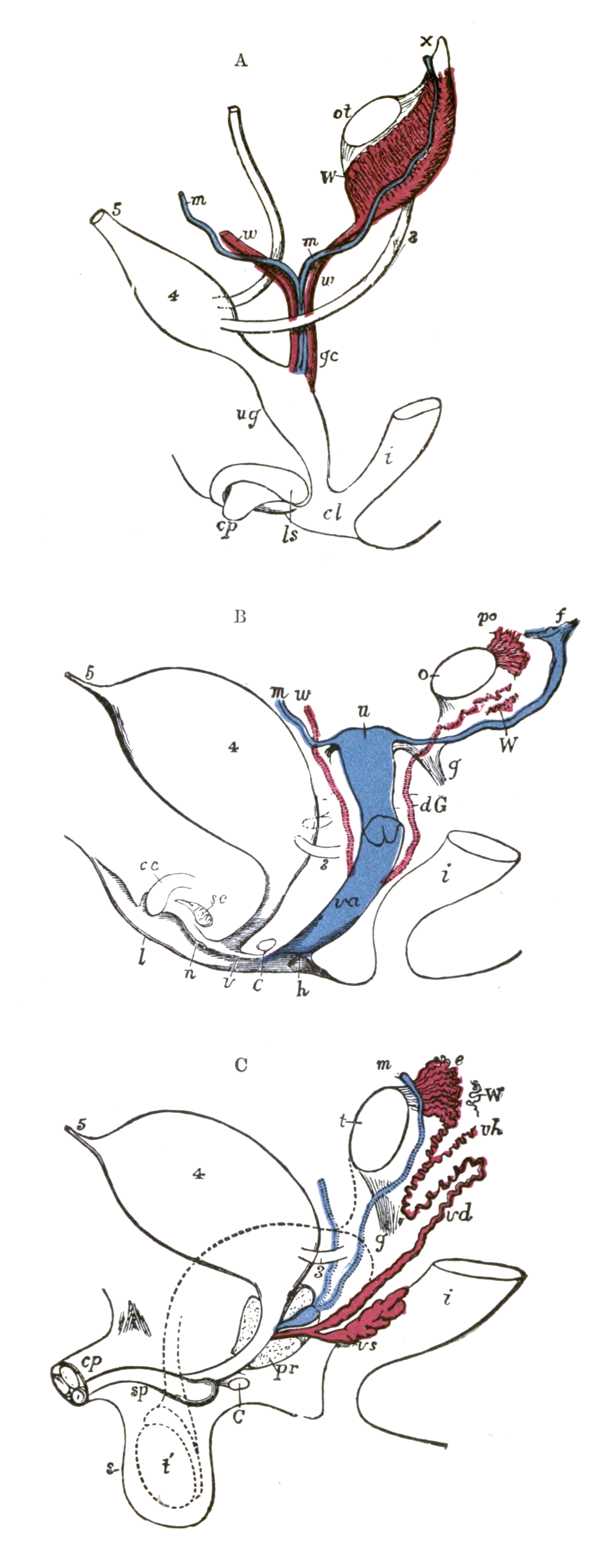
Diagrams that show the development of male and female organs from a common precursor. Sperm ducts and fallopian tubes are not homologous, as the sperm ducts originate from the Wolffian ducts, whereas the fallopian tubes originate from the Müllerian ducts.

| Embryological precursor | Female | Male |
|---|---|---|
| 3. Ureter | Ureter | Ureter |
| 4. Urinary bladder | Urinary bladder | Urinary bladder |
| 5. Urachus | Urachus | Urachus |
| i. Lower part of the intestine | i. Lower part of the intestine | i. Lower part of the intestine |
| cl. Cloaca | | |
| cp. Elevation which becomes clitoris or penis (genital tubercle) | cc. Corpus cavernosum clitoridis | cp. Corpus cavernosum penis cut short |
| ug. Sinus urogenitalis | C. Greater vestibular gland, and immediately above it the urethra | C. Bulbourethral gland of one side |
| | f. Abdominal opening of the left uterine tube | |
| | g. Round ligament, corresponding to gubernaculum | g. Gubernaculum |
| | h. Situation of the hymen | |
| m, m. Right and left Müllerian ducts uniting together and running with the Wolffian ducts in gc, the genital cord | | m. Müllerian duct, the upper part of which remains as the hydatid of Morgagni; the lower part, represented by a dotted line descending to the prostatic utricle, constitutes the occasionally existing cornu and tube of the uterus masculinus |
| ot. The genital ridge from which either the ovary or testis is formed. | o. The left ovary | t. Testis in the place of its original formation; t', together with the dotted lines above, indicates the direction in which the testis and epididymis descend from the abdomen into the scrotum. |
| | Skene's glands a.k.a. paraurethral gland | pr. Prostate |
| | u. Uterus. The uterine tube of the right side is marked m. | |
| | va. Vagina | |
| | | vh. Ductus aberrans |
| | | vs. Vesicula seminalis |
| W. Left Wolffian body | | W. Scattered remains of the Wolffian body, constituting the organ of Giraldès, or the paradidymis of Waldeyer. |
| w, w. Right and left Wolffian ducts | W. Scattered remains of Wolffian tubes near it (paroöphoron of Waldeyer); dG. Remains of the left Wolffian duct, such as give rise to the duct of Gartner, represented by dotted lines; that of the right side is marked w. | |
| | po. Epoophoron | |

== External organs ==
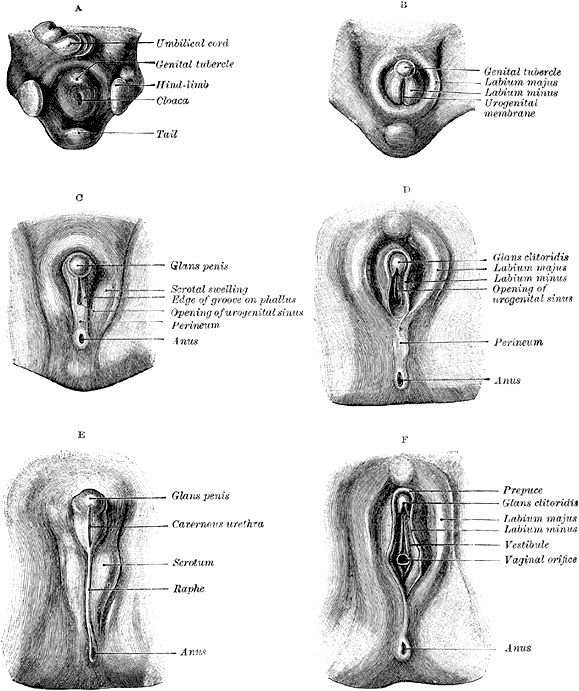
Stages in the development of the external sexual organs in the male and female: A: Undifferentiated; B: Female; C: Male; D: Female; E: Male; F: Female

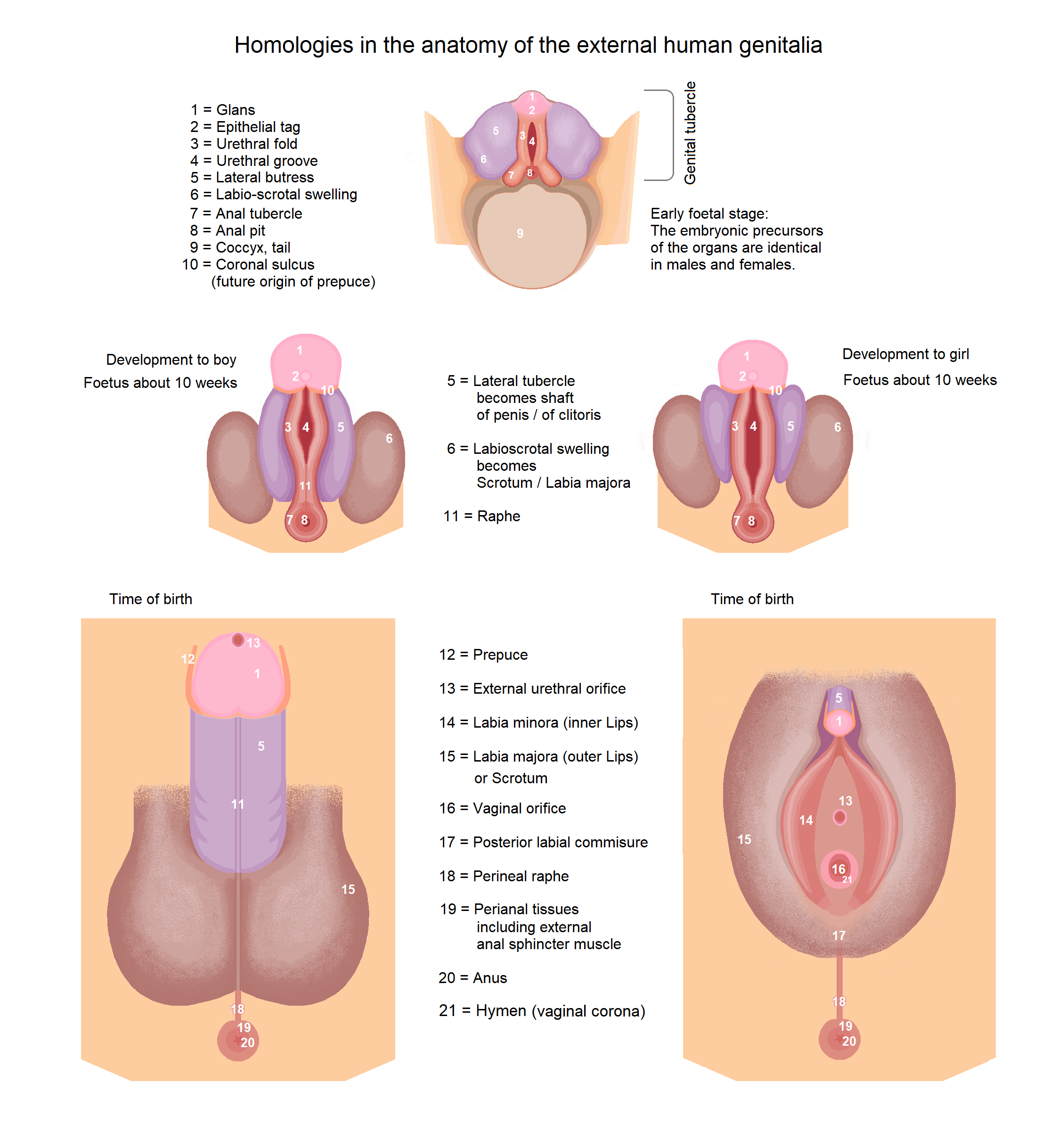
Development of external genitalia

The external genitalia of both males and females have similar origins. They arise from the genital tubercle that forms anterior to the cloacal folds (proliferating mesenchymal cells around the cloacal membrane). The caudal aspect of the cloacal folds further subdivides into the posterior anal folds and the anterior urethral folds. Bilateral to the urethral fold, genital swellings become prominent. These structures are the future scrotum and labia majora in males and females, respectively.

The genital tubercles of an eight-week-old embryo of either sex are identical. They both have a glans area, which will go on to form the clitoral glans (females) or penile glans (males), a urogenital fold and groove, and an anal tubercle. At around ten weeks, the external genitalia are still similar. At the base of the glans, there is a groove known as the coronal sulcus or corona glandis. It is the site of attachment of the future prepuce. Just anterior to the anal tubercle, the caudal end of the left and right urethral folds fuse to form the urethral raphe. The lateral part of the genital tubercle (called the lateral tubercle) grows longitudinally and is about the same length in either sex.

=== Human physiology ===
The male external genitalia include the penis and the scrotum. The female external genitalia include the clitoris, the labia, and the vestibule, which are collectively called the vulva. External genitalia vary widely in external appearance among different people.

One difference between the glans penis and the glans clitoridis is that the glans clitoridis packs nerve endings into a volume only about one-tenth the size of the glans penis. Therefore, the glans clitoridis has greater variability in cutaneous corpuscular receptor density (1-14 per 100× high-powered field) compared with the glans penis (1-3 per 100× high-power field). Touch for touch, this concentration of nerves makes the glans clitoridis more sensitive than the glans penis. As a result, many women can feel discomfort or pain with anything more than a gentle touch.
