= Development of the urinary system =

Mechanisms that form the urinary system

The development of the urinary system begins during prenatal development, and relates to the development of the urogenital system – both the organs of the urinary system and the sex organs of the reproductive system. The development continues as a part of sexual differentiation.

The urinary and reproductive organs are developed from the intermediate mesoderm. The permanent organs of the adult are preceded by a set of structures which are purely embryonic, and which with the exception of the ducts disappear almost entirely before birth. These embryonic structures are on either side; the pronephros, the mesonephros and the metanephros of the kidney, and the Wolffian and Müllerian ducts of the sex organ. The pronephros disappears very early; the structural elements of the mesonephros mostly degenerate, but the gonad is developed in their place, with which the Wolffian duct remains as the duct in males, and the Müllerian as that of the female. Some of the tubules of the mesonephros form part of the permanent kidney.

== Pronephros and Wolffian duct ==
=== Wolffian duct ===
In the outer part of the intermediate mesoderm, immediately under the ectoderm, in the region from the fifth cervical segment to the third thoracic segment, a series of short evaginations from each segment grows dorsally and extends caudally, fusing successively from before backward to form the pronephric duct. This continues to grow caudally until it opens into the ventral part of the cloaca; beyond the pronephros it is termed the Wolffian duct. Thus, the Wolffian duct is what remains of the pronephric duct after the atrophy of the pronephros.

=== Pronephros ===
The original evaginations form a series of transverse tubules each of which communicates by means of a funnel-shaped ciliated opening with the abdominal cavity, and in the course of each duct a glomerulus also is developed. A secondary glomerulus is formed ventral to each of these, and the complete group constitutes the pronephros. In humans, the pronephros is just rudimentary, and undergoes rapid atrophy and disappears.

== Wolffian duct ==
=== Mesonephros ===
On the medial side of the Wolffian duct, from the sixth cervical to the third lumbar segments, a series of tubules, the Wolffian tubules, develops. They increase in number by outgrowths from the original tubules. They change from solid masses of cells to instead become hollowed in the center. One end grows toward and finally opens into the Wolffian duct, the other dilates and is invaginated by a tuft of capillary bloodvessels to form a glomerulus. The tubules collectively constitute the mesonephros.

The mesonephros persists and form the permanent kidneys in fish and amphibians, but in reptiles, birds, and mammals, it atrophies and for the most part disappears rapidly as the permanent kidney (metanephros) develops beginning during the sixth or seventh week, so that by the beginning of the fifth month only the ducts and a few of the tubules of the mesonephros remain.

=== Development in male ===
In the male, the Wolffian duct persists, and forms for example the epididymis, the ductus deferens, the ejaculatory duct, seminal vesicle and efferent ducts.

In the female, on the other hand, the Wolffian bodies and ducts atrophy, leaving behind only remnants in the adult, involving e.g. the development of the suspensory ligament of the ovary.

== Müllerian duct ==
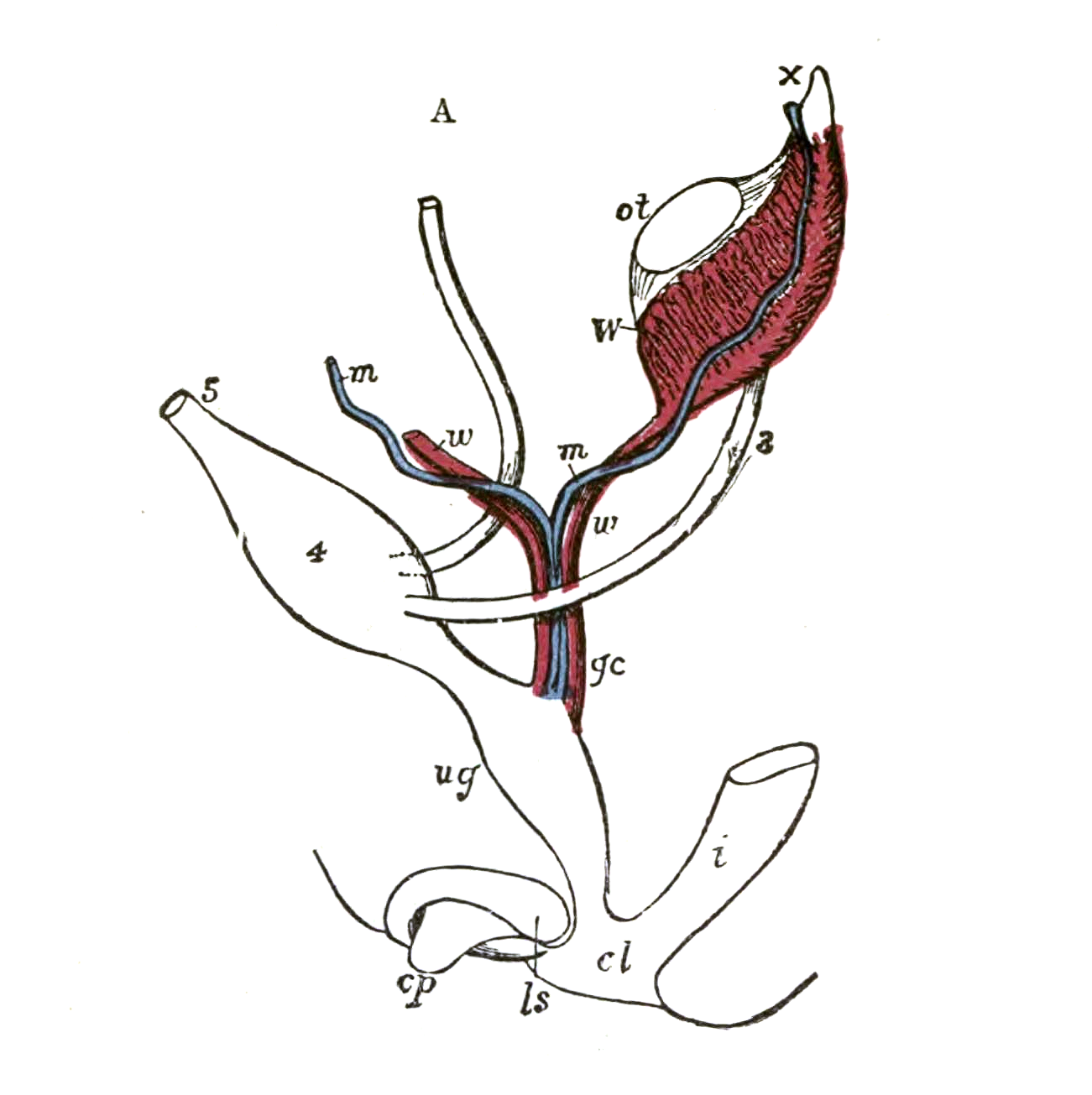
A.—Diagram of the primitive urogenital organs in the embryo previous to sexual distinction. The common genital cord is labeled with gc. * 3. Ureter. * 4. Urinary bladder. * 5. Urachus. * cl. Cloaca. * cp. Elevation which becomes clitoris or penis. * i. Lower part of the intestine. * ls. Fold of integument from which the labia majora or scrotum are formed. * m, m. Right and left Müllerian ducts uniting together and running with the Wolffian ducts in gc, the common genital cord. * ot. The gonadal ridge from which either the ovary or testis is formed. * ug. Sinus urogenitalis. * W. Left Wolffian body. * w, w. Right and left Wolffian ducts.

Shortly after the formation of the Wolffian ducts, a second pair of ducts is developed; these are the Müllerian ducts. Each arises on the lateral aspect of the corresponding Wolffian duct as a tubular invagination of the cells lining the abdominal cavity. The orifice of the invagination remains open, and undergoes enlargement and modification to form the abdominal ostium of the fallopian tube. The ducts pass backward lateral to the Wolffian ducts, but toward the posterior end of the embryo they cross to the medial side of these ducts, and thus come to lie side by side between and behind the latter—the four ducts forming what is termed the common genital cord, to distinguish it from the genital cords of the germinal epithelium seen later in this article. The Müllerian ducts end in an epithelial elevation, the Müllerian eminence, on the ventral part of the cloaca between the orifices of the Wolffian ducts. At a later stage, the eminence opens in the middle, connecting the Müllerian ducts with the cloaca.

=== Atrophy in males ===
In the male, the Müllerian ducts atrophy, but traces of their anterior ends are represented by the appendices testis (hydatids of Morgagni of the male), while their terminal fused portions form the utriculus in the floor of the prostatic urethra.

=== Development in females ===
In the female, the Müllerian ducts persist and undergo further development. The portions which lie in the genital cord fuse to form the uterus and vagina. This fusion of the Müllerian ducts begins in the third month, and the septum formed by their fused medial walls disappears from below upward.

The parts outside this cord remain separate, and each forms the corresponding fallopian tube. The ostium of the fallopian tube remains from the anterior extremity of the original tubular invagination from the abdominal cavity.

Around the fifth month, a ring-like constriction marks the position of the cervix of the uterus, and after the sixth month, the walls of the uterus begin to thicken. For some time, the vagina is represented by a solid rod of epithelial cells. A ring-like outgrowth of this epithelium occurs at the lower end of the uterus and marks the future vaginal fornix. At about the fifth or sixth month, the lumen of the vagina is produced by the breaking down of the central cells of the epithelium. The hymen represents the remains of the Müllerian eminence.

== Metanephros and definitive kidney ==
The metanephros is the definite, permanent, but yet immature kidney. It arises from two directions. On one hand, the precursor of the ureter buds from the Wolffian duct, while on the other hand, the precursor of the renal tubules develop from the metanephrogenic blastema. The ureteric bud subsequently grows into the latter mass, forming the parts of the nephron. Other changes include e.g. the translocation of the ureteric opening directly into the cloaca.

=== Ureteric bud ===
The rudiments of the permanent kidneys make their appearance about the end of the first or the beginning of the second month. Each kidney originates as a ureteric bud from the caudal end of the Wolffian duct, which, in turn, originates from intermediate mesoderm. The ureteric bud starts close to where the Wolffian duct opens into the cloaca, and grows dorsalward and rostralward along the posterior abdominal wall, where its blind extremity expands and subsequently divides into several buds, which form the rudiments of the renal pelvis and renal calyces; by continued growth and subdivision it gives rise to the collecting duct system of the kidney. The other, more superficial, portion of the diverticulum, on the other hand, becomes the ureter.

=== Metanephrogenic blastema ===
The renal corpuscles and renal tubules, in contrast, are developed from the metanephrogenic blastema instead of from the ureteric bud. The metanephrogenic blastema is moulded over the growing end of the latter, and becomes a part of the metanephros in this way. The renal tubules of the metanephros, unlike those of the pronephros and mesonephros, do not open into the Wolffian duct. Instead, the tubules rapidly elongate to form the parts of the nephron: the proximal tubules, the loops of Henle and the distal convoluted tubules. These last join and establish communications with the collecting duct system derived from the ultimate ramifications of the ureteric bud. In the other end, the renal tubules give rise to Bowman's capsules and glomeruli.

=== Other changes ===
The mesoderm around the tubules becomes condensed to form the connective tissue of the kidney. The ureter opens at first into the hind-end of the Wolffian duct; after the sixth week it separates from the Wolffian duct, and opens independently into the part of the cloaca which ultimately becomes the urinary bladder. The renal tubules become arranged into renal pyramids, and the lobulated condition of the kidneys exists for some time after birth, while traces of it may be found even in the adult. The kidney of the ox and many other animals, on the other hand, remains lobulated throughout life.

== Urinary bladder ==
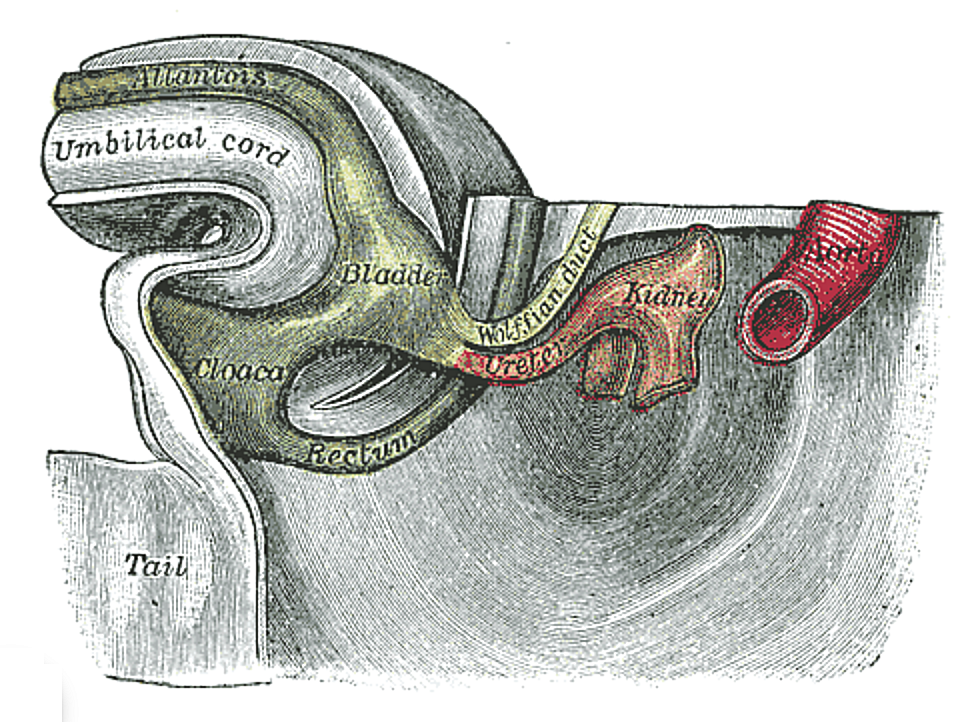
Tail end of human embryo thirty-two to thirty-three days old. The entodermal cloaca is visible at center left, labeled in green.

The urinary bladder is formed partly from the endodermal cloaca and partly from the ends of the Wolffian ducts. In other words, the allantois takes no share in its formation.

After the separation of the rectum from the dorsal part of the cloaca, the ventral part becomes the primary urogenital sinus. The urogenital sinus, in turn, divides into the superficial definitive urogenital sinus and the deeper anterior vesico-urethral portion.

=== Definitive urogenital sinus ===
The definitive urogenital sinus consists of a caudal phallic portion and an intermediate narrow channel, the pelvic portion.

=== Vesico-urethral portion ===
The vesico-urethral portion is the deepest, continuous with the allantois. It absorbs the ends of the Wolffian ducts and the associated ends of the renal diverticula, and these give rise to the trigone of urinary bladder and part of the prostatic urethra. The remainder of the vesico-urethral portion forms the body of the bladder and part of the prostatic urethra; its apex is prolonged to the umbilicus as a narrow canal, the urachus, which later is obliterated and becomes the median umbilical ligament of the adult.

== Sex organs ==
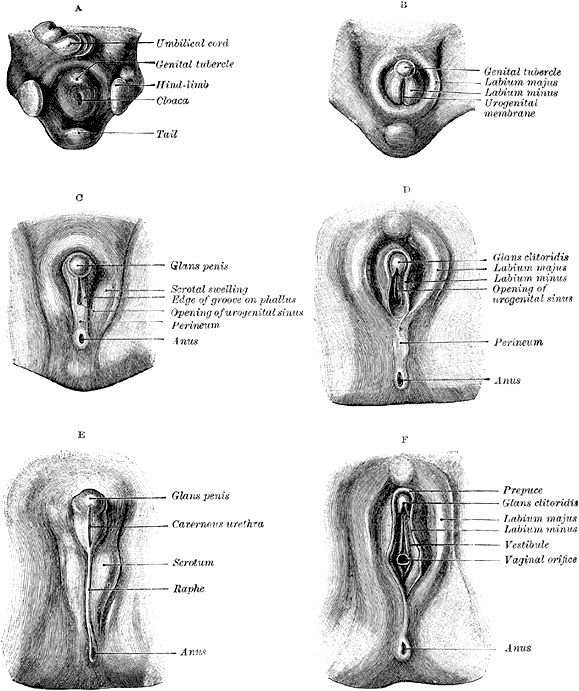
Development of external genitalia. A: common development. C, E: male development. B, D, F: female development

Until about the ninth week of gestational age, the sex organs of males and females look the same, and follow a common development. This includes the development of a genital tubercle and a membrane dorsally to it, covering the developing urogenital opening, and the development of labioscrotal folds.

Even after differentiation can be seen between the sexes, some stages are common, e.g. the disappearing of the membrane. On the other hand, sex-dependent development include further protrusion of the genital tubercle in the male to form the penis. Furthermore, the labioscrotal folds evolve into the scrotum in males, while they evolve into labia in females.

== Diagram of internal differentiation ==
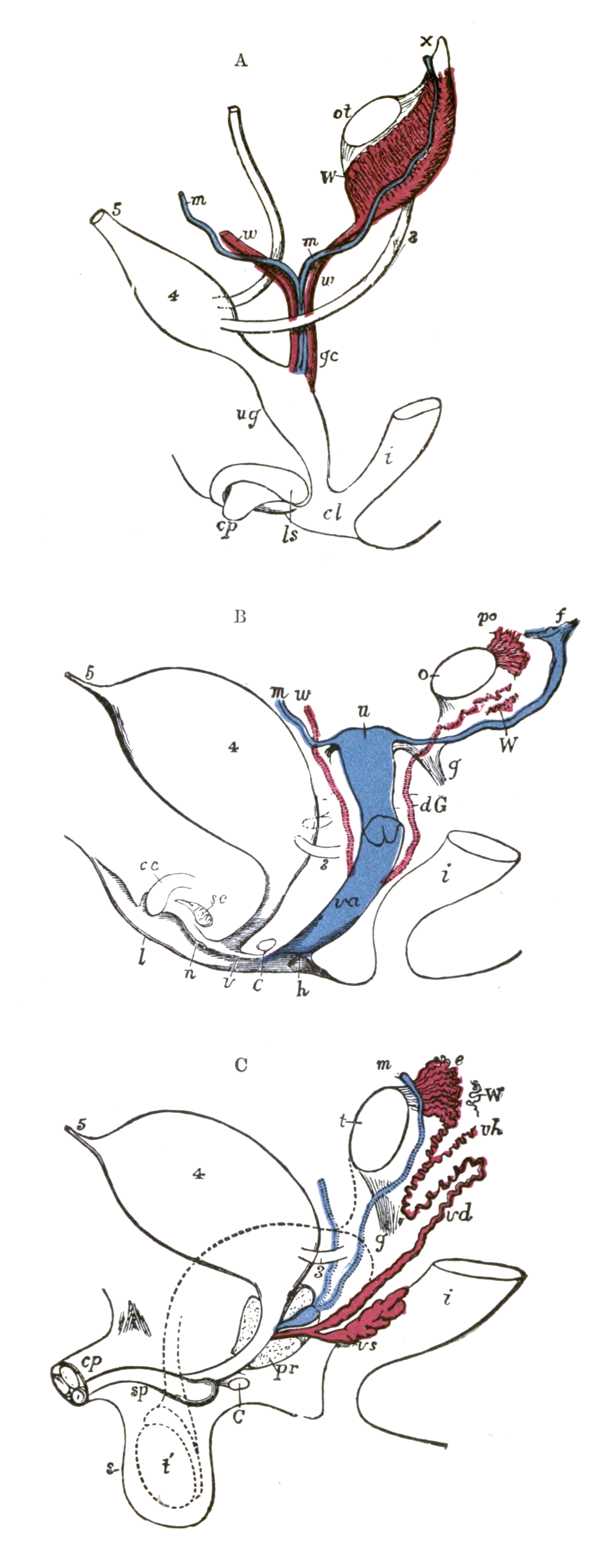
Diagrams to show the development of male and female generative organs from a common type

A.—Diagram of the primitive urogenital organs in the embryo previous to sexual distinction.

- 3. Ureter.
- 4. Urinary bladder.
- 5. Urachus.
- cl. Cloaca.
- cp. Elevation which becomes clitoris or penis.
- i. Lower part of the intestine.
- ls. Fold of integument from which the labia majora or scrotum are formed.
- m, m. Right and left Müllerian ducts uniting together and running with the Wolffian ducts in gc, the genital cord.
- ot. The genital ridge from which either the ovary or testis is formed.
- ug. Sinus urogenitalis.
- W. Left Wolffian body.
- w, w. Right and left Wolffian ducts.

B.—Diagram of the female type of sexual organs.

- C. Greater vestibular gland, and immediately above it the urethra.
- cc. Corpus cavernosum clitoridis.
- dG. Remains of the left Wolffian duct, such as give rise to the duct of Gärtner, represented by dotted lines; that of the right side is marked w.
- f. The abdominal opening of the left uterine tube.
- g. Round ligament, corresponding to gubernaculum.
- h. Situation of the hymen.
- i. Lower part of the intestine.
- l. Labium majus.
- n. Labium minus.
- o. The left ovary.
- po. Epoophoron.
- sc. Corpus cavernosum urethrae.
- u. Uterus. The uterine tube of the right side is marked m.
- v. Vulva.
- va. Vagina.
- W. Scattered remains of Wolffian tubes near it (paroöphoron of Waldeyer).

C.—Diagram of the male type of sexual organs.

- C. Bulbo-urethral gland of one side.
- cp. Corpora cavernosa penis cut short.
- e. Caput epididymis.
- g. The gubernaculum.
- i. Lower part of the intestine.
- m. Müllerian duct, the upper part of which remains as the hydatid of Morgagni; the lower part, represented by a dotted line descending to the prostatic utricle, constitutes the occasionally existing cornu and tube of the uterus masculinus.
- pr. The prostate.
- s. Scrotum.
- sp. Corpus cavernosum urethrae.
- t. Testis in the place of its original formation.
- t’, together with the dotted lines above, indicates the direction in which the testis and epididymis descend from the abdomen into the scrotum.
- vd. Ductus deferens.
- vh. Ductus aberrans.
- vs. The vesicula seminalis.
- W. Scattered remains of the Wolffian body, constituting the organ of Giraldès, or the paradidymis of Waldeyer.

== See also ==
- Development of the reproductive system
