= Ductuli transversi =

Details
- Precursor: Mesonephros

Identifiers
- Latin: ductuli transversi epoophori
- TA98: A09.1.05.003
- TA2: 3542
- FMA: 18695

The epoöphoron lies in the mesosalpinx between the ovary and the uterine tube, and consists of a few short tubules, the ductuli transversi which converge toward the ovary while their opposite ends open into a rudimentary duct, the ductus longitudinalis epoöphori (duct of Gartner).

The ductuli transversi of the epoophoron is a remnant of the tubules of the Wolffian body or mesonephros.
