= Prostatic ducts =

Part of the prostate gland

Details

Identifiers
- Latin: ductuli prostatici
- TA98: A09.3.08.019
- TA2: 3652
- FMA: 71651

The prostatic ducts (or prostatic ductules) open into the floor of the prostatic portion of the urethra, and are lined by two layers of epithelium, the inner layer consisting of columnar and the outer of small cubical cells.

Small colloid masses, known as amyloid bodies are often found in the gland tubes.

They open onto the prostatic sinus.

== See also ==
- Prostate
