= Prostatic sinus =

Space along the urethra in the prostate

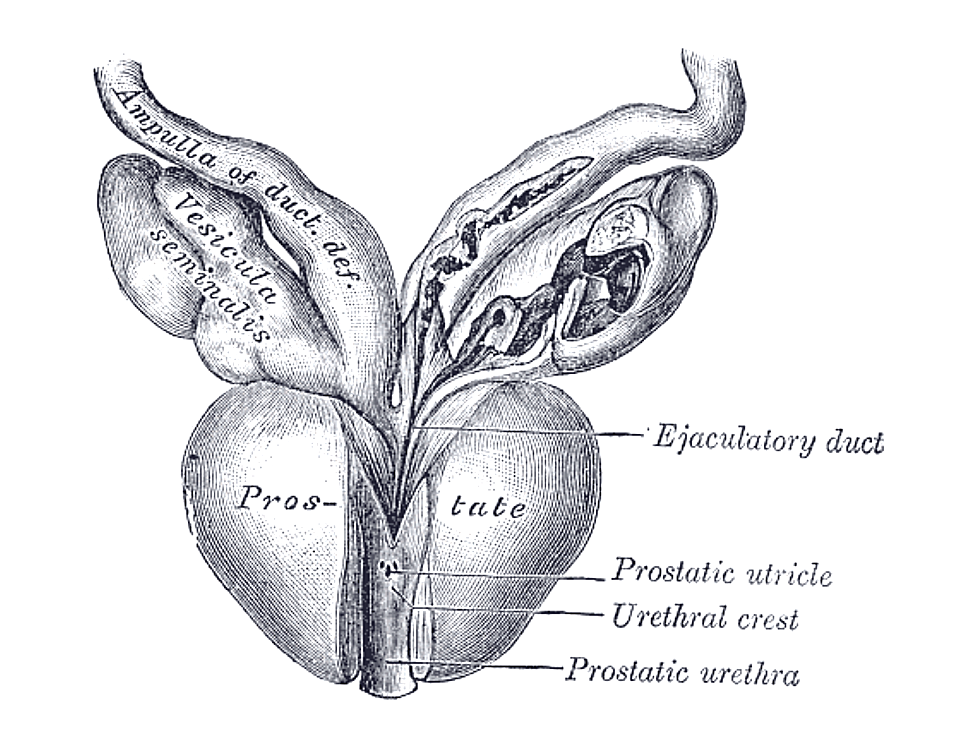
- Vesiculae seminales and ampullæ of ductus deferentes, seen from the front.

- Dissection of the prostate showing the prostatic urethra. The prostatic ducts are seen opening into the prostatic sinus (unlabeled), which lies on either side of the urethral crest and seminal colliculus.

Details

Identifiers
- Latin: sinus prostaticus
- TA98: A09.4.02.010
- TA2: 3451
- FMA: 19604

On either side of the urethral crest is a slightly depressed fossa, the prostatic sinus, the floor of which is perforated by numerous apertures, the orifices of the prostatic ducts from the lateral lobes of the prostate.
