= Glans =

Anatomical structure in mammals

The glans (/ɡlænz/, pl.: glandes /ˈɡlændiːz/; from the Latin word for "acorn") is a vascular structure located at the tip of the penis in male mammals or a homologous genital structure of the clitoris in female mammals. The corresponding adjective is glandar (UK: /ˈɡlændə/; US: /ˈɡlændər/), from Latin glandaris. (Note: Not to be confused with glandular ("of or relating to glands"), from Latin glandularis.) The glans has also been called the balanus (/ˈbælənəs/; from Latin balanus, itself derived from Ancient Greek βάλανος bálanos, meaning "acorn; glans"), whence another adjective, balanic (/bəˈlænɪk/).

== Structure ==
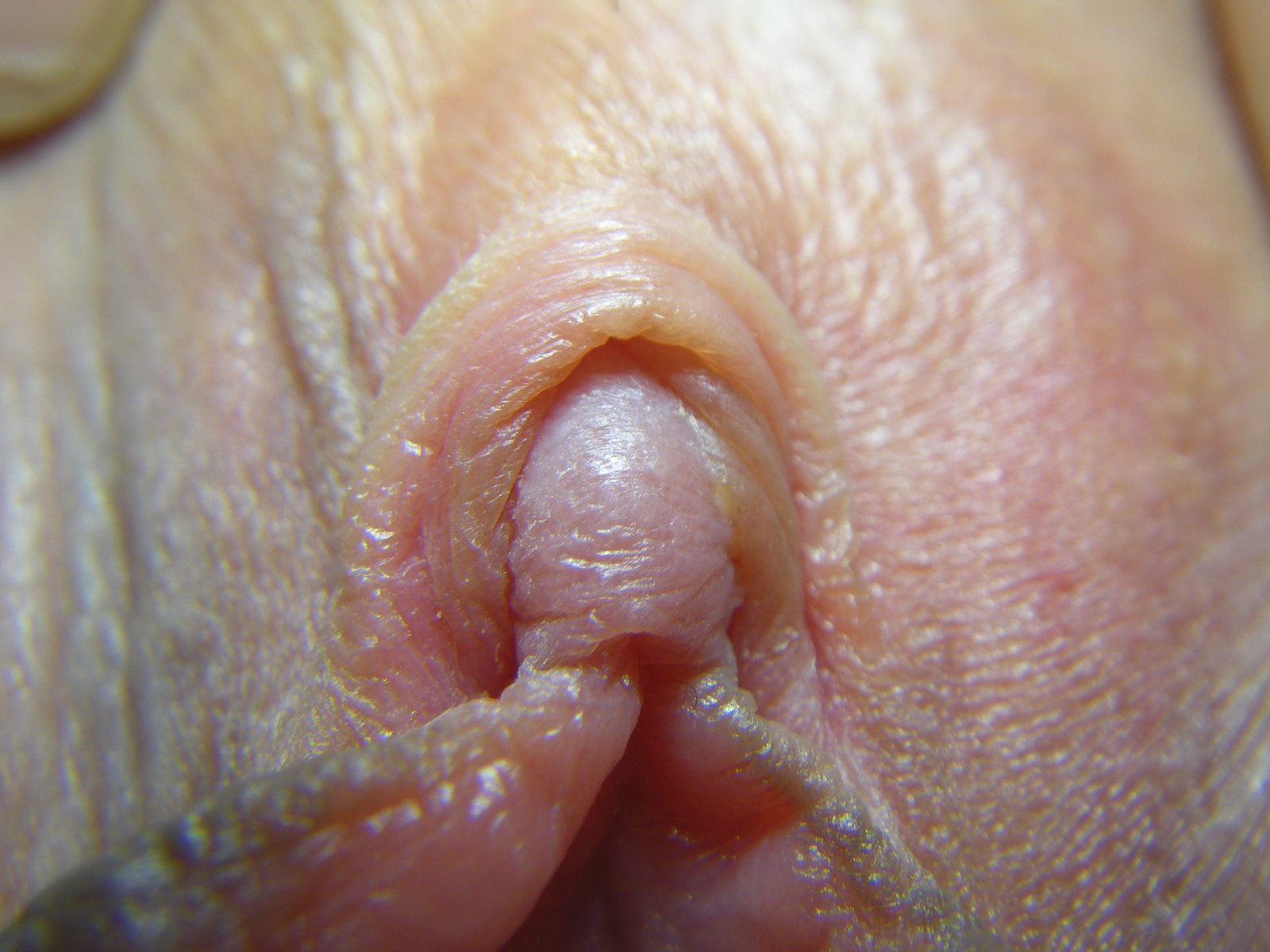
Typical human female glans clitoridis, a pea-sized structure between the clitoral hood and the urinary meatus

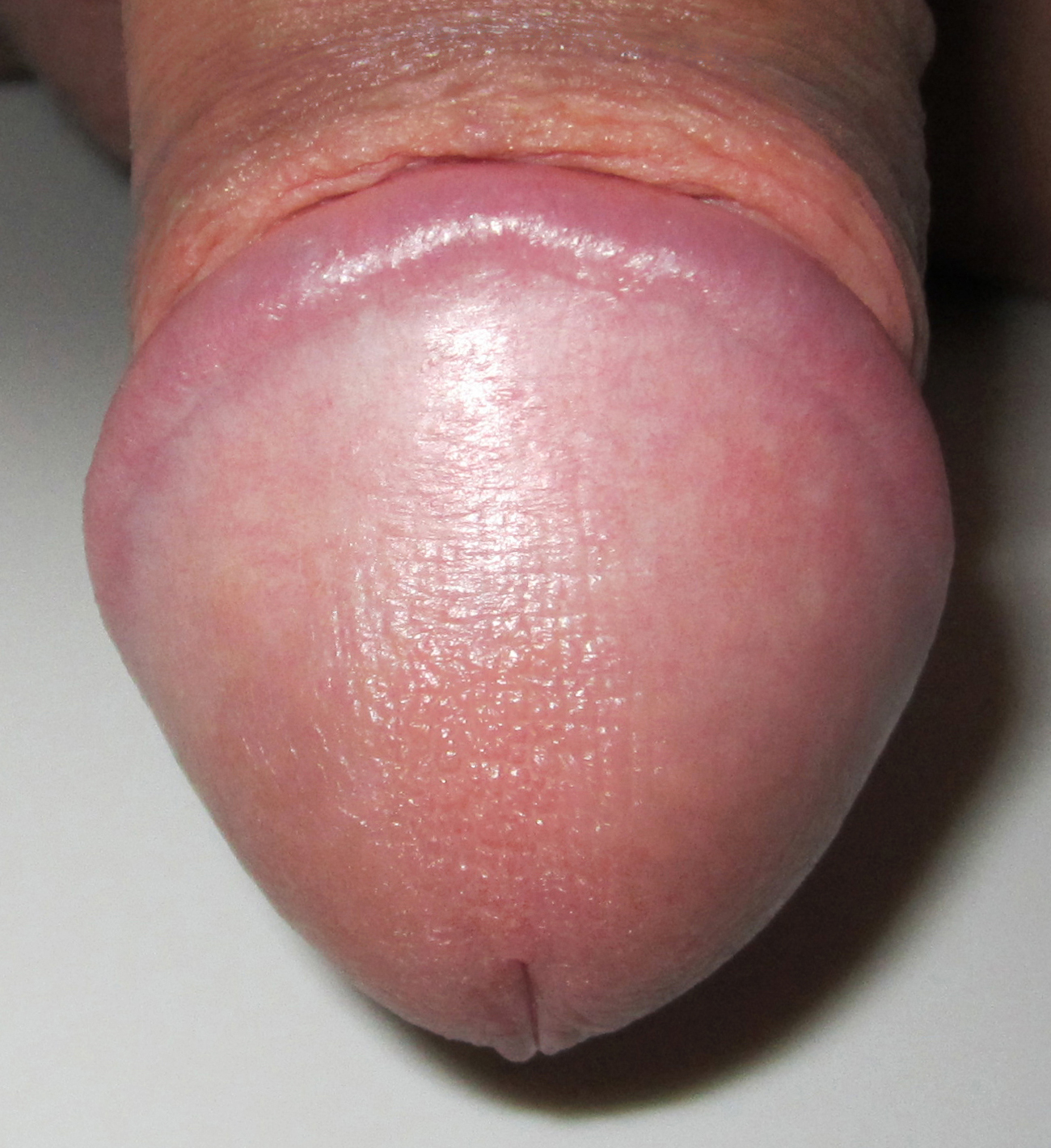
Typical human male glans penis, at the end of the penis, showing the urinary meatus at its tip

The exterior structure of the glans consists of mucous membrane, which is usually covered by foreskin or clitoral hood in naturally developed genitalia. This covering, called the prepuce, is normally retractable in adulthood unless removed by circumcision.

The glans naturally joins with the frenulum of the penis or clitoris, as well as the inner labia in women, and the foreskin in men. In non-technical or sexual discussions, often the word "clitoris" refers to the external glans alone, excluding the clitoral hood, frenulum, and internal body of the clitoris. Similarly, phrases "tip" or "head" of the penis refers to the glans alone.

== Sex differences in humans ==
In males, the glans is known as the glans penis, while in females the glans is known as the clitoral glans.

In females, the clitoris is above the urethra. The glans of the clitoris is the most highly innervated part of the external female genitalia.

== Sex differences in other mammals ==
In spotted hyenas, the female's pseudo-penis can be distinguished from the male's penis by its greater thickness and more rounded glans. In both male and female spotted hyenas, the base of the glans is covered with penile spines.

== Development ==
In the development of the urinary and reproductive organs, the glans is derived from the genital tubercle.

== See also ==
- Glanuloplasty
