= Utricle =

Utricle (Latin: utriculus, diminutive of uter, utris, meaning "leather bag") may refer to:

- Utricle (ear), a part of the inner ear
  - Macula of utricle
- Utricle, inner glume around ovary of Carex sedge plant. Also known as perigynium
- Utricle (fruit), a type of dry fruit similar to an achene
- Utricle (seaweed), an air filled sac in certain seaweeds
- Prostatic utricle, a small indentation in the prostate
