= Subpreputial wetness =

Subpreputial wetness is a lanolin-like wetness commonly found under the prepuce in most female and male individuals who have not undergone circumcision, as well as in the female vulva area. If allowed to accumulate along with dead epithelial cells, the combination is commonly called smegma. Smegma is a whitish substance which can be removed by washing, whereas subpreputial wetness is a transparent lubricating secretion. The two substances are commonly confused.
