= Pronephric duct =

Biological predecessor of the mesonephric duct

Details
- Precursor: Intermediate mesoderm
- Gives rise to: Mesonephric duct

Identifiers
- Latin: ductus pronephricus
- TE: duct_by_E5.6.1.0.0.0.5 E5.6.1.0.0.0.5

The pronephric duct is the predecessor of the mesonephric duct (Wolffian duct).

== Development ==
The development of the pronephric duct is a part of the development of the urinary system, and the development of the reproductive system.

In the outer part of the intermediate mesoderm, immediately under the ectoderm, in the region from the fifth cervical segment to the third thoracic segment, a series of short evaginations from each segment grows dorsally and extends caudally, fusing successively from before backward to form the pronephric duct. This continues to grow caudalward until it opens into the ventral part of the cloaca; beyond the pronephros it is termed the mesonephric duct. Thus, the mesonephric duct remains after the atrophy of the pronephros.
