= Glanuloplasty =

Glanuloplasty or balanoplasty is plastic surgery carried out on a glans. Typical examples include correcting a hypospadias on the penis, or attempting to restore a clitoris mutilated by female genital cutting.
