= Hermann Treschow Gartner =

Hermann Treschow Gartner (born October 1785, on the island of Saint Thomas; died 4 April 1827, Copenhagen), was a Danish surgeon and anatomist. His name is associated with the discovery and description of the ductus epoophori longitudinalis (1822). The duct that now bears his name — Gartner's duct.

== Life ==
Hermann Treschow, was the elder brother of the physician Benjamin Gartner Treschow, was born on the Island of Saint Thomas, then a Danish possession in the West Indies. He came to Copenhagen at the age of ten and from 1803 studied in Copenhagen, graduating in 1807. He was amanuensis under professor Frederik Christian Winslow (1752–1811), whose grandfather was the brother of the famous Jacob Benignus Winslow (1669–1760).

In 1809 he became regimental surgeon in the Norwegian army. From 1809 to 1811 he was Physicus in Bradsberg. In 1811-1812 he undertook further studies in London and Edinburgh. In 1815 obtained his doctorate in Copenhagen. He settled in practice in Copenhagen and became military surgeon in 1825, but died already in 1827.

== Selected works ==
- Praecipia queaedam momenta de hernia inguinali et crurali cum anatomicis explorationibus etc.. Doctoral dissertation, 1815.
