= Urethral crest =

Anatomical feature of the urinary system

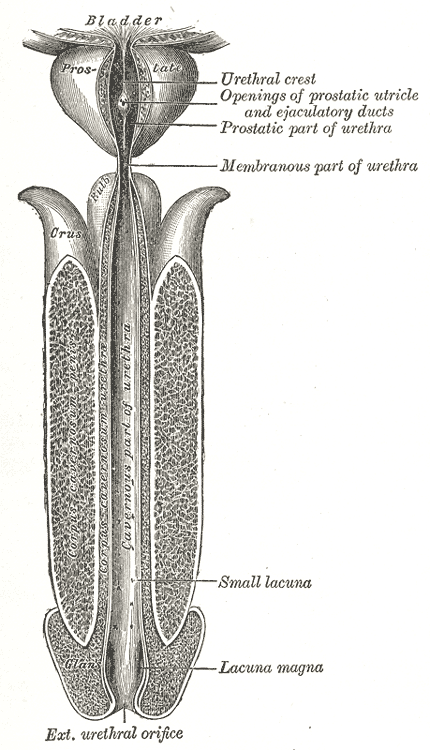
- The male urethra laid open on its anterior (upper) surface. (Urethral crest labeled at upper right.)

- Dissection of prostate showing prostatic urethra and urethral crest on posterior wall

Details

Identifiers
- Latin: crista urethralis urethrae masculinae, crista urethralis urethrae femininae
- TA98: A09.2.03.004; A09.4.02.007
- TA2: 3430, 3446
- FMA: 19718

The urethral crest is an anatomical feature present in the urinary system of both males and females.

In males, the urethral crest is known as the crista urethralis masculinae, or the crista phallica, and is a longitudinal fold on the posterior wall of the urethra extending from the uvula of the bladder through the prostatic urethra. It is from 15 to 17 mm. in length, and about 3 mm. in height, and contains muscular and erectile tissue. When distended, it may serve to prevent the passage of the semen backward into the bladder.

In females, it is known as the crista urethralis femininae, and is a conspicuous longitudinal fold of mucosa on the posterior wall of the urethra.

== Additional images ==
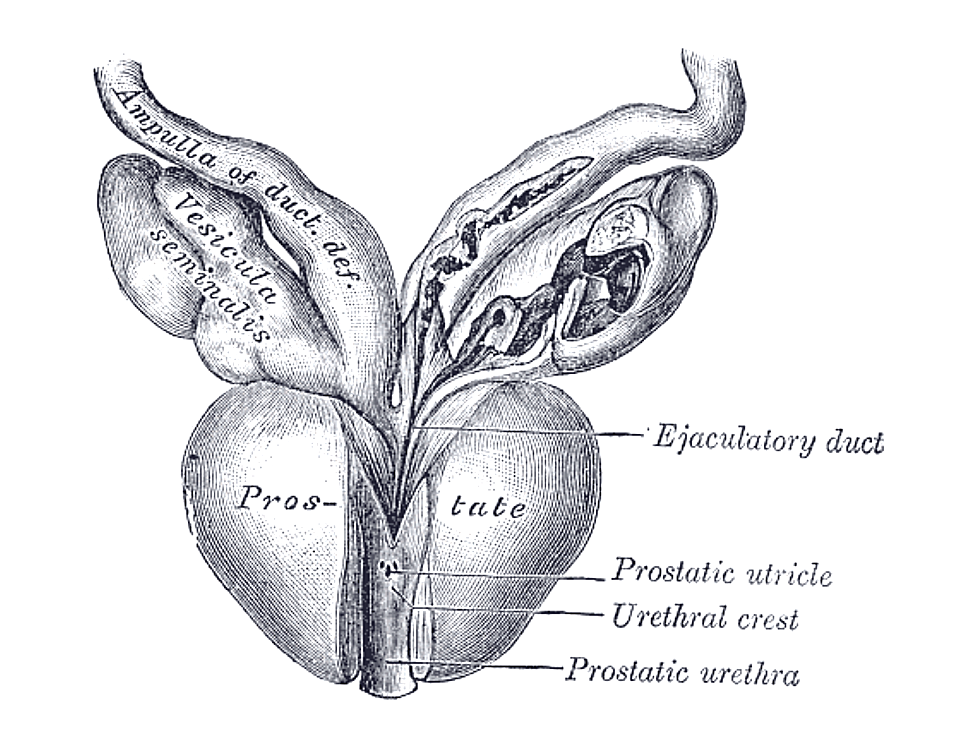
Vesiculæ seminales and ampullæ of ductus deferentes, seen from the front
