= Mesonephric tubules =

Genital ridges that are next to the mesonephros

Details

Identifiers
- Latin: tubuli mesonephrici
- TE: tubules_by_E5.6.2.1.0.0.1, E5.7.2.1.0.0.2 E5.6.2.1.0.0.1, E5.7.2.1.0.0.2

Mesonephric tubules are genital ridges that are next to the mesonephros.

In males, some of the mesonephric kidney tubules, instead of being used to filter blood like the rest, "grow" over to the developing testes, penetrate them, and become connected to the seminiferous tubules of the testes. They also form the paradidymis.

The sperm differentiate inside the seminiferous tubules, then swim down these tubes, then through these special mesonephric tubules, and go down inside Wolffian duct, to the coelom and finally to the organ the animal uses to transport sperm into females.

In females, the structure gives rise to the paroöphoron.
