= Prostatic utricle =

Indentation in the prostatic urethra of human males

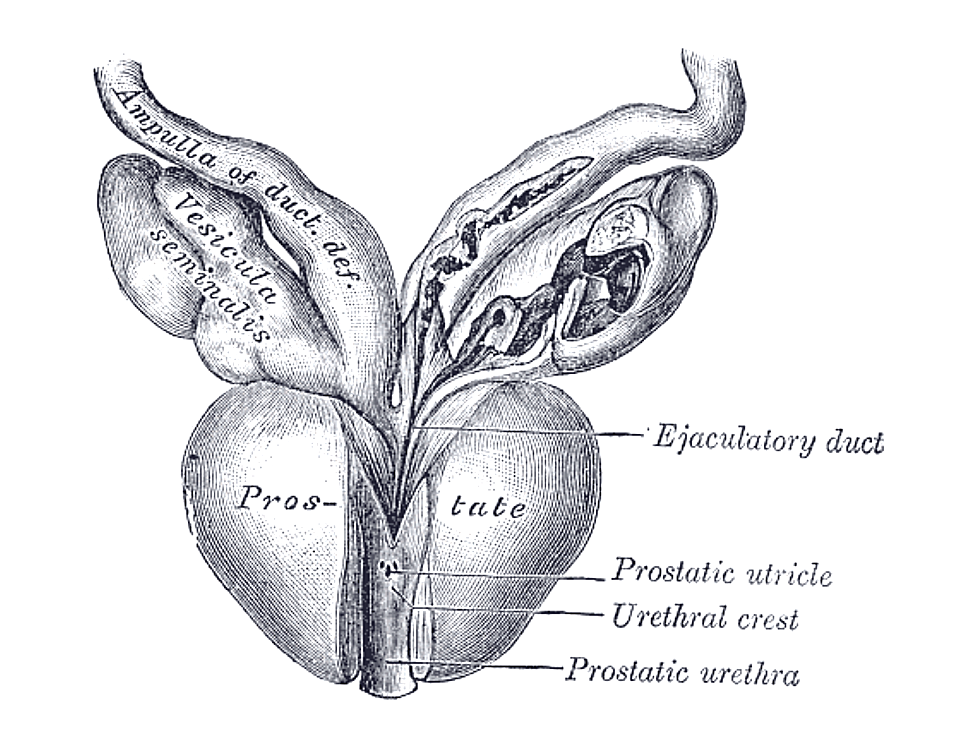
- Vesiculae seminales and ampullae of ductus deferentes, seen from the front.

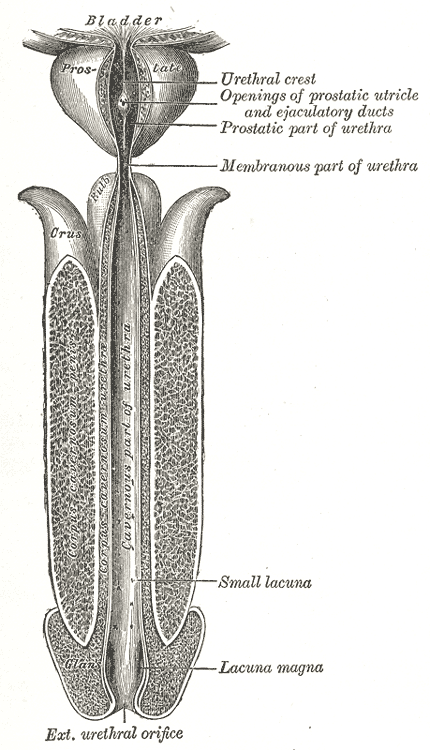
- The male urethra laid open on its anterior (upper) surface.

Details
- Precursor: Paramesonephric ducts

Identifiers
- Latin: utriculus prostaticus, utriculus masculinus, vagina masculina, sinus pocularis
- TA98: A09.4.02.009
- TA2: 3449
- FMA: 19702

The prostatic utricle (Latin for "small pouch of the prostate") is a small indentation in the prostatic urethra, at the apex of the urethral crest, on the seminal colliculus (verumontanum), laterally flanked by openings of the ejaculatory ducts. It is also known as the vagina masculina, (Note: Especially in cases with intersex men who have female internal organs.) uterus masculinus or (in older literature) vesicula prostatica.

== Structure ==
It is often described as "blind", meaning that it is a duct that does not lead to any other structures. It tends to be about one cm in length. It can sometimes be enlarged. The utricle is deemed enlarged if it allows insertion of a cystoscope at least 2 cm deep. This is often associated with hypospadias.

Dissection of prostate showing prostatic utricle opening into the prostatic urethra.

== Function ==
The prostatic utricle is a remnant that is homologous to the female uterus (including the cervix) and vagina, usually described as derived from the paramesonephric ducts, although this is occasionally disputed.

In 1905, Robert William Taylor described the function of the utricle: "In coitus it so contracts that it draws upon the openings of the ejaculatory ducts, and thus renders them so patulous that the semen readily passes through."

== See also ==
- List of related male and female reproductive organs
