= Ductuli aberrantes =

Two long narrow tubes

Details

Identifiers
- Latin: ductuli aberrantes
- TA98: A09.3.02.007
- TA2: 3609
- FMA: 76517

Ductuli aberrantes are two long narrow tubes, the ductulus aberrans inferior and the ductulus aberrans superior. The ductulus aberrant inferior (vas aberrans of Haller), is occasionally found connected with the lower part of the canal of the epididymis, or with the commencement of the vas deferens.

Its length varies from 3.5 to 35 cm., and it may become dilated toward its extremity; more commonly, it retains the same diameter throughout.

Its structure is similar to that of the ductus deferens.

Occasionally, it is found unconnected with the epididymis.

A second tube, the ductulus aberrans superior, occurs in the head of the epididymis; it is connected with the rete testis.
