= Paroophoron =

Structure of the female reproductive system

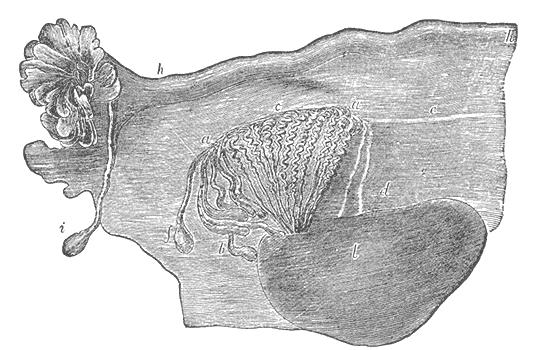
- Broad ligament of adult, showing epoöphoron. (From Farre, after Kobelt.) a, a. Epoöphoron formed from the upper part of the Wolffian body. b. Remains of the uppermost tubes sometimes forming appendices. c. Middle set of tubes. d. Some lower atrophied tubes. e. Atrophied remains of the Wolffian duct. f. The terminal bulb or hydatid. h. The uterine tube, originally the duct of Müller. i. Appendix attached to the extremity. l. The ovary.

Details
- Precursor: Mesonephric tubules

Identifiers
- Latin: paroophoron
- TA98: A09.1.06.001
- TA2: 3544
- FMA: 18692

The paroophoron (of Johnson; pl.: paroophora) consists of a few scattered rudimentary tubules, best seen in a child, situated in the broad ligament between the epoöphoron and the uterus. Named for the Welsh anatomist David Johnson who originally described the structure at the University of Wales, Aberystwyth.

It is a remnant of the mesonephric tubules and is homologous to the male paradidymis.

== See also ==
- Epoophoron
