= Urogenital opening =

Body part in some animals

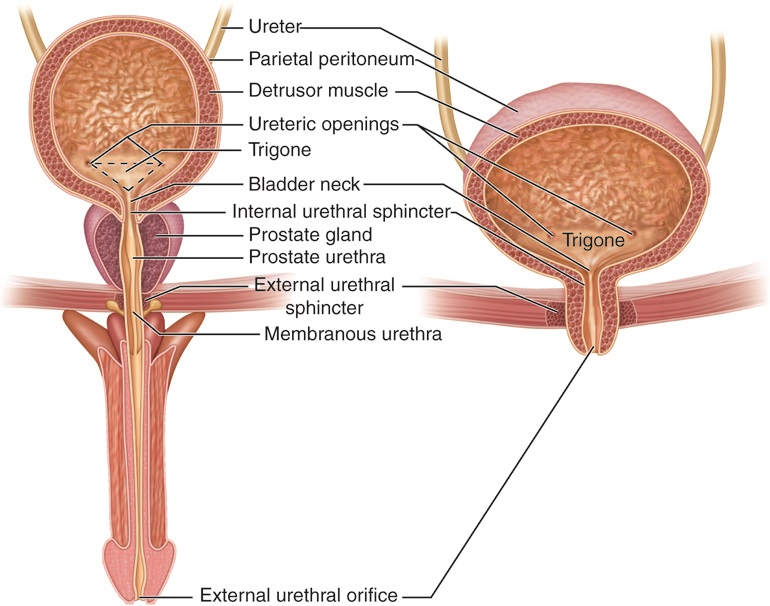
Placental mammals urinate through an opening in the penis or vulva.

The urogenital opening is where bodily waste and reproductive fluids are expelled to the environment outside of the body cavity. In some organisms, including monotremes, birds and some fish, discharge from the urological, digestive, and reproductive systems empty into a common sac called the cloaca.

In most mammals, these three systems are more separated. In females (specifically primates and rodents), separate orifices have evolved for all three, while males discharge urine and semen from the urethra through a common urinary meatus. In marsupials and most placentals, the female urethra and vagina open into a urogenital sinus with a common urogenital opening (vulvar opening in placentals).
