= Gartner's duct =

Potential embryological remnant in human female development

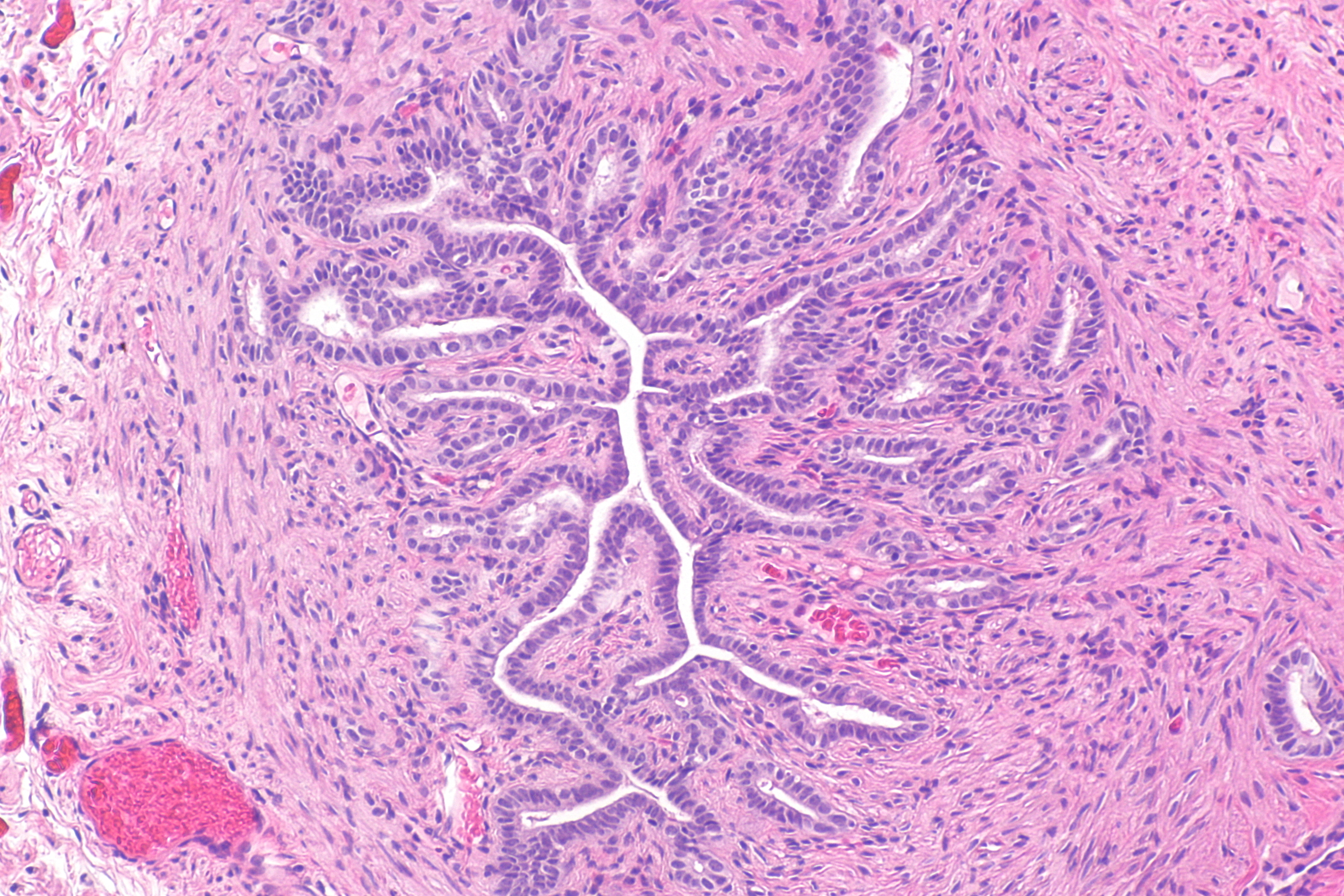

Details
- Precursor: Mesonephric duct

Identifiers
- Latin: ductus longitudinalis epoophori

Gartner's duct, also known as Gartner's canal or the ductus longitudinalis epoophori, is a potential embryological remnant in human female development of the mesonephric duct in the development of the urinary and reproductive organs. It was discovered and described in 1822 by Hermann Treschow Gartner.

Gartner's duct is located in the uterus' broad ligament. Its position is parallel with the lateral uterine tube and lateral walls of vagina and cervix.

The paired mesonephric ducts in the male, in contrast, go on to form the paired epididymides, vasa deferentia, ejaculatory ducts and seminal vesicles.

In females, they may persist between the layer of the broad ligament of the uterus and in the wall of the vagina.

== Clinical significance ==
These may give rise to Gartner's duct cysts.

== See also ==
- List of homologues of the human reproductive system
