= Prepuce =

Prepuce /ˈpriːpjuːs/, or as an adjective, preputial /prɪˈpjuːʃəl/, refers to two homologous structures of male and female genitals:

- Foreskin, skin surrounding and protecting the head of the penis in humans
- Penile sheath, skin surrounding and protecting the head of the penis in other mammals
- Clitoral hood, skin surrounding and protecting the head of the clitoris in humans
- Clitoral sheath, skin surrounding and protecting the head of the clitoris in other mammals
