= Endodermic evagination =

Layer of cells in embryonic development

Endodermic evagination relates to the inner germ layers of cells of the very early embryo, from which is formed the lining of the digestive tract, of other internal organs, and of certain glands, implies the extension of a layer of body tissue to form a pouch, or the turning inside out (protrusion) of some body part or organ from its basic position, for example the para-nasal sinuses are believed to be formed in the fetus by 'ballooning' of the developing nasal canal, and the prostate or Skene's gland formed out of evaginations of the urethra.

== See also ==
- List of human cell types derived from the germ layers
