= Paradidymis =

Structure of the male reproductive system

Details
- Precursor: Mesonephric tubules

Identifiers
- Latin: paradidymis
- TA98: A09.3.03.001
- TA2: 3614

The term paradidymis (pl.: paradidymides; organ of Giraldés) is applied to a small collection of convoluted tubules, situated in front of the lower part of the spermatic cord, above the head of the epididymis.

These tubes are lined with columnar ciliated epithelium, and probably represent the remains of a part of the Wolffian body, like the epididymis, but are functionless and vestigial. The Wolffian body operates as a kidney (mesonephros) in fishes and amphibians, but the corresponding tissue is co-opted to form parts of the male reproductive system in other classes of vertebrate. The paradidymis represents a remnant of an unused, atrophied part of the Wolffian body.

The paradidymis is homologous to the female paroophoron, as they both arise from mesonephric tubules.
