= Prostatic urethra =

Widest and most dilatable part of the urethra canal

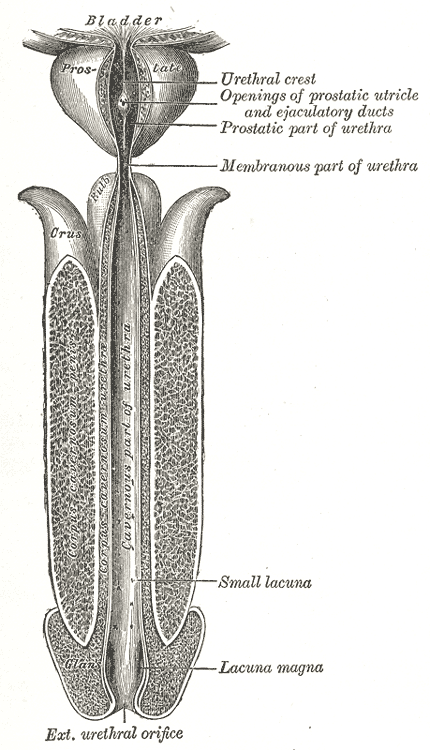
- The male urethra laid open on its anterior (upper) surface. (Prostatic part labeled at upper right.)

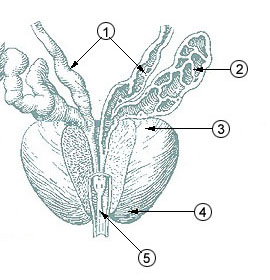
- 1: Vas deferens 2: Seminal vesicle 3: Base of the prostate 4: Apex of the prostate 5: Prostatic urethra

Details

Identifiers
- Latin: pars prostatica urethrae
- TA98: A09.4.02.004
- TA2: 3445
- FMA: 19673

The prostatic urethra, the widest and most dilatable part of the urethra canal, is about 3 cm long.

It runs almost vertically through the prostate from its base to its apex, lying nearer its anterior than its posterior surface; the form of the canal is spindle-shaped, being wider in the middle than at either extremity, and narrowest below, where it joins the membranous portion.

A transverse section of the canal as it lies in the prostate is horse-shoe-shaped, with the convexity directed forward.

The keyhole sign, in ultrasound, is associated with a dilated bladder and prostatic urethra.

== Additional images ==
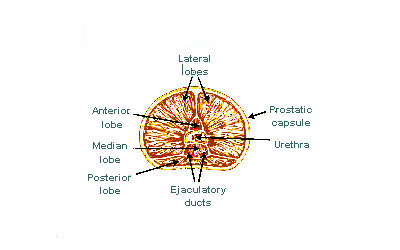
Lobes of prostate

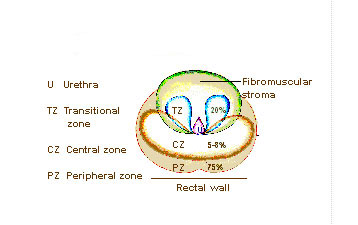
Zones of prostate

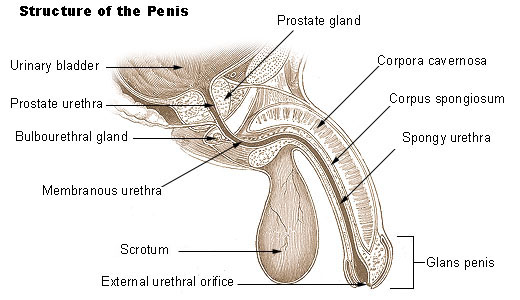
Structure of the penis

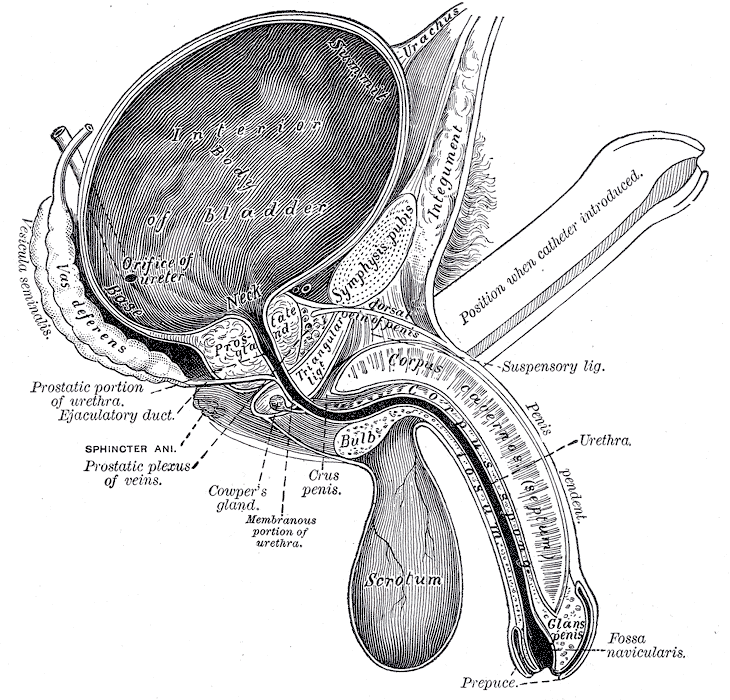
Vertical section of bladder, penis, and urethra.

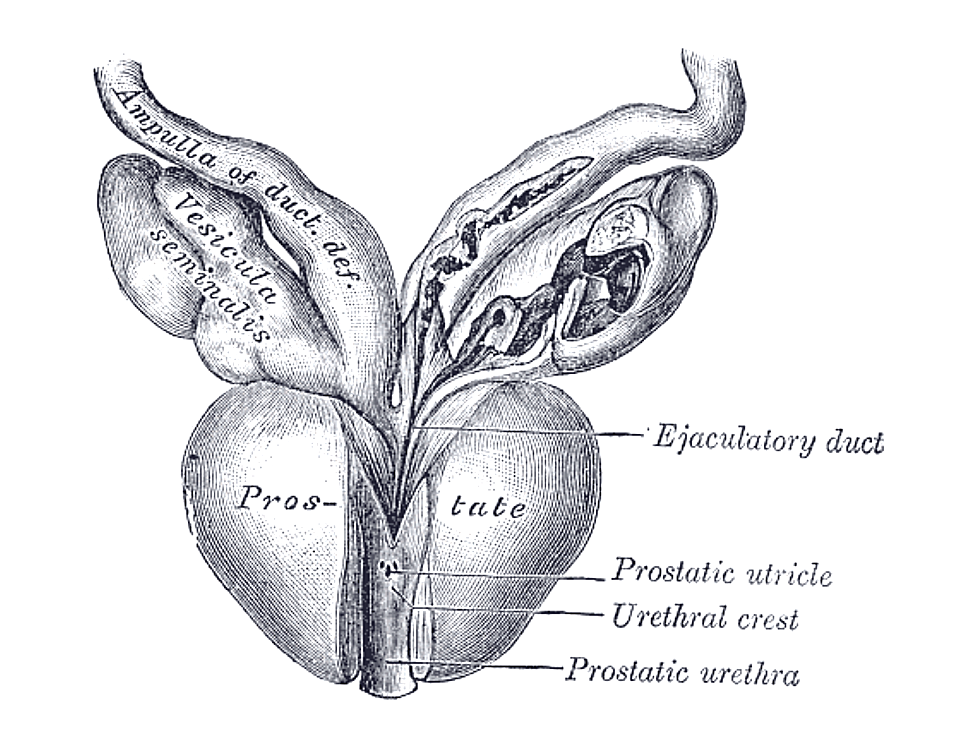
Vesiculæ seminales and ampullæ of ductus deferentes, seen from the front.
